= Second Battle of Monte Cassino order of battle February 1944 =

Second Battle of Monte Cassino order of battle February 1944 is a listing of the significant formations involved in the fighting on the Winter Line in February 1944 during the period generally known as the Second Battle of Monte Cassino.

== Allied Armies in Italy ==
C-in-C: General Sir Harold Alexander
Chief of Staff: Lieutenant-General Sir John Harding

=== British 8th Army ===
Commander:

Lieutenant-General Oliver Leese

==== New Zealand Corps ====
Lieutenant-General Bernard Freyberg
- 2nd New Zealand Division (Major-General Howard Kippenberger)
  - 5th Infantry Brigade
    - 21st Infantry Battalion
    - 23rd Infantry Battalion
    - 28th (Māori) Infantry Battalion
  - 6th Infantry Brigade
    - 24th Infantry Battalion
    - 25th Infantry Battalion
    - 26th Infantry Battalion
  - 4th Armoured Brigade
    - 18th Armoured Regiment
    - 19th Armoured Regiment
    - 20th Armoured Regiment
    - 22nd Motorised Battalion
  - Divisional troops
    - 4th, 5th and 6th Field Regiments, New Zealand Artillery
    - 14th Light Anti-aircraft Regiment, NZA
    - 11th and 17th Field Regiments, Royal Artillery
    - 66th and 80th Medium Regiments, RA
    - 6th, 7th and 8th Field Company, New Zealand Engineers
    - 5th Field Park Company, NZE
    - 2nd NZ Division Reconnaissance Regiment
- 4th Indian Infantry Division (Major-General Francis Tuker until 4 February then Brigadier Harry Dimoline (due to illness))
  - 5th Indian Infantry Brigade (Brigadier D. R. E. R. Bateman)
    - 1/4th Battalion, Essex Regiment
    - 4th Battalion, 6th Rajputana Rifles
    - 1st Battalion, 6th Gurkha Rifles
  - 7th Indian Infantry Brigade (Brigadier O. de T. Lovett)
    - 1st Battalion, Royal Sussex Regiment
    - 4th Battalion, 16th Punjab Regiment
    - 1st Battalion, 2nd Gurkha Rifles
  - 11th Indian Infantry Brigade (Brigadier V. C. Griffin)
    - 2nd Battalion, Queen's Own Cameron Highlanders
    - 1st Battalion, 6th Rajputana Rifles
    - 2nd Battalion, 7th Gurkha Rifles
  - Divisional troops
    - 1st, 11th and 31st Field Regiments, Royal Artillery
    - 149th Anti-tank Regiment, RA
    - 27th Anti-aircraft Regiment, RA
    - Engineers
      - 4th Field Company, King George's Own Bengal Sappers and Miners
      - 12th Field Company, Queen Victoria's Own Madras Sappers and Miners
      - 21st Field Company, Royal Bombay Sappers and Miners
      - 11th Field Park Company, Queen Victoria's Own Madras Sappers and Miners
      - 5th Indian Bridging Platoon
    - Central India Horse (Reconnaissance Regiment)
    - Machine gun Battalion, 6th Rajputana Rifles
- British 78th Infantry Division (from 17 February) (Major-General Charles Keightley)
  - 11th British Infantry Brigade
    - 2nd Battalion, Lancashire Fusiliers
    - 1st Battalion, East Surrey Regiment
    - 5th (Huntingdonshire) Battalion, Northamptonshire Regiment
  - 36th British Infantry Brigade
    - 5th Battalion, Buffs (Royal East Kent Regiment)
    - 6th Battalion, Queen's Own Royal West Kent Regiment
    - 8th Battalion, Argyll and Sutherland Highlanders
  - 38th (Irish) Infantry Brigade
    - 2nd Battalion, London Irish Rifles
    - 1st Battalion, Royal Irish Fusiliers
    - 6th Battalion, Royal Inniskilling Fusiliers
  - Divisional troops
    - 17th, 132nd and 128th Field Regiments, RA
    - 64th Anti-tank Regiment, RA
    - 49th Light Anti-aircraft Regiment, RA
    - 214th, 237th and 256th Field Company, Royal Engineers
    - 281st Field Park Company, RE
    - 21st Bridging Platoon, RE
    - 56th Reconnaissance Regiment
    - 1st Battalion, Kensington Regiment (MG)
- Corps troops
- 2nd Army Group, RA (under command)
  - 166th (Newfoundland) Field Artillery Regiment
  - Two additional Field Regiments, RA
  - Five Medium Regiments, RA

== German Army Group C ==
Commander:

Field Marshal Albert Kesselring

=== Tenth Army ===
Commander: General Heinrich von Vietinghoff

==== XIV Panzer Corps ====
Lieutenant-General Frido von Senger und Etterlin
- 15th Panzergrenadier Division (elements at Anzio ordered back to Tenth Army on 8 February) (Major General (Generalleutnant) Rudolf Sperl)
  - 104th Panzer Grenadier Regiment
    - 3 battalions
  - 115th Panzer Grenadier Regiment
    - 3 battalions
  - 129th Panzer Grenadier Regiment
    - 3 battalions
  - Divisional troops
    - 115th Armoured Reconnaissance battalion
    - 115th Panzer battalion
    - 33rd Artillery battalion
    - 33rd Anti-tank battalion
    - 115th Engineer battalion
- 29th Panzergrenadier Division (ordered to Anzio early Feb) Lieutenant General (General der Panzertruppen) Walter Fries)
  - 15th Panzer Grenadier Regiment
    - 3 battalions
  - 71st Panzer Grenadier Regiment
    - 3 battalions
  - Divisional troops
    - 129th Armoured Reconnaissance battalion
    - 129th Panzer battalion
    - 29th Artillery Regiment
    - 29th Anti-tank battalion
    - 29th Engineer battalion
    - 171st Engineer battalion
- 44th Infantry Division (Major General (Generalleutnant) Friedrich Franek)
  - 131st Infantry Regiment
    - 3 battalions
  - 132nd Infantry Regiment
    - 3 battalions
  - 134th Infantry Regiment
    - 3 battalions
  - Divisional troops
    - 44th Fusilier battalion
    - 96th Artillery Regiment
    - 46th Anti-tank battalion
    - 96th Engineer battalion
- 71st Infantry Division (elements at Anzio ordered back to Tenth Army on 8 February) (Major General (Generalleutnant) Wilhelm Raapke)
  - 191st Infantry Regiment
    - 3 battalions
  - 194th Infantry Regiment
    - 3 battalions
  - 211th Infantry Regiment
    - 3 battalions
  - Divisional troops
    - 171st Fusilier battalion
    - 171st Artillery Regiment
    - 171st Anti-tank battalion
- 90th Panzergrenadier Division (Major-General Ernst-Gunther Baade. Placed in charge of all troops in the Cassino position from 1 February.)
  - 155th Panzer Grenadier Regiment
    - 3 battalions
  - 200th Panzer Grenadier Regiment (Colonel von Behr)
    - 3 battalions
  - 361st Panzer Grenadier Regiment
    - 3 battalions
  - Divisional troops
    - 190th Armoured Reconnaissance battalion
    - 190th Panzer battalion
    - 190th Artillery Regiment
    - 90th Anti-tank battalion
    - 90th Engineer battalion
    - 3rd battalion 3rd Parachute Regiment (Note: From 1st Parachute Division)
    - 2nd battalion 1st Parachute Regiment
    - Parachute Machine Gun Battalion
    - 4th Alpine Battalion
- 94th Infantry Division (Major General (Generalleutnant) Bernhard Steinmetz)
  - 267th Infantry Regiment
    - 3 battalions
  - 274th Infantry Regiment
    - 3 battalions
  - 276th Infantry Regiment
    - 3 battalions
  - Divisional troops
    - 94th Fusilier battalion
    - 194th Artillery Regiment
    - 194th Anti-tank battalion
    - 94th Engineer battalion

== Notes ==
Footnotes

Citations

== Sources ==
- Ellis, John (2003) [1984]. Cassino, The Hollow Victory: The Battle for Rome, January-June 1944. London: Arum Press. ISBN 1-85410-916-2.
- Houterman, Hans; Koppes, Jeroen. "World War II unit histories and officers". Archived from the original on 3 December 2008.
- Joslen, H. F. (2003) [1st Pub. HMSO 1960]. Orders of battle : Second World War, 1939-1945. Uckfield: Naval & Military Press. ISBN 1-84342-474-6.
- Molony, Brigadier C.J.C.; with Flynn, Captain F.C. (R.N.); Davies, Major-General H.L. & Gleave, Group Captain T.P. (2004) [1st. pub. HMSO:1973]. Butler, Sir James (ed.). The Mediterranean and Middle East, Volume V: The Campaign in Sicily 1943 and The Campaign in Italy 3rd September 1943 to 31st March 1944. History of the Second World War, United Kingdom Military Series. Uckfield, UK: Naval & Military Press. ISBN 1-84574-069-6.
- "Orders of Battle.com". Archived from the original on 17 July 2007.
- Wendell, Marcus. "Axis History Factbook: German army order of battle".
