= Divisional Cavalry Regiment =

Divisional Cavalry Regiment can refer to the following units:

- Australian 6th Divisional Cavalry Regiment
- 2nd New Zealand Divisional Cavalry Regiment
