= Divisional Cavalry Regiment (New Zealand) =

Former armoured cavalry regiment of the 2nd New Zealand Division

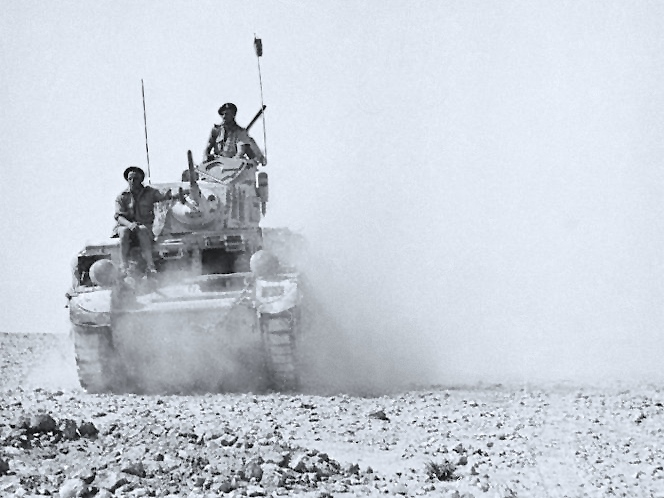
- A Stuart tank from the regiment at El Alamein, July 1942
- Active: 1939–1947
- Country: New Zealand
- Branch: New Zealand Military Forces
- Type: Armoured cavalry
- Part of: 2nd New Zealand Division
- Engagements: Battle of Greece; Battle of Crete; North African Campaign; Italian Campaign; Occupation of Japan

The Divisional Cavalry Regiment (Div Cav) was an armoured cavalry regiment of the 2nd New Zealand Division during the Second World War and was New Zealand's first armoured unit. It served as a reconnaissance force for the 2nd New Zealand Division. Formed on 29 September 1939, the regiment embarked for Egypt on 4 January 1940. It fought with the division, as part of the 2nd New Zealand Expeditionary Force, in Greece, Crete, North Africa and Italy. The regiment formed part of J Force, New Zealand's contribution to the occupation of Japan at the end of the war.

Initially stationed at Maadi, the regiment was moved to Garawla in July and participated in the defence of the Baggush Box two months later. In January 1941, it moved to Helwan for training. In March, the regiment became part of W Force, the British contingent sent to Greece to defend the country from Nazi Germany. It took up positions on the Aliakmon Line before the regiment was scattered during the British retreat from the country. Most of the regiment ended up in Crete, where it faced a German paratroop attack in May and evacuated with the remainder of the British force.

After spending several months re-equipping, Div Cav fought in Operation Crusader and was the first unit to enter Bardia in January 1942. After returning to Maadi, the regiment was sent to Syria with the 2nd New Zealand Division to prevent an Axis attack from Turkey and was sent back to Egypt after the British rout in the Battle of Gazala. It fought at the first and second battles of El Alamein and the Battle of Alam el Halfa. The regiment pursued retreating German troops and fought at the Battle of El Agheila. In January 1943 it was based at Castel Benito, and participated in the Battle of the Mareth Line in March. After the German surrender in Tunisia on 13 May, the regiment moved back to Maadi for refitting.

In September the regiment was sent to Italy with the rest of the division and fought in the Moro River Campaign on the Adriatic coast in December. The division fought in the Battle of Monte Cassino, for which Div Cav provided support. The regiment then participated in the drive on the Gothic Line, where elements entered Florence in August. In October it was reorganised as the Divisional Cavalry Battalion, an infantry unit, because its armoured cars were unsuitable for Italian terrain. The battalion fought in the final Allied offensive in Italy, Operation Grapeshot, during early 1945. It reached Trieste in the first week of May and was stationed there until February 1946. That month the Divisional Cavalry deployed to Japan, once again as a regiment. Stationed in southern Kyushu, it was disbanded on 1 September 1947.

== Formation ==
After the beginning of the Second World War, the government of New Zealand authorised the formation of the 2nd New Zealand Expeditionary Force (2 NZEF). Following discussions with the British government, it was decided that New Zealand's contribution to the war would be an infantry division, the 2nd New Zealand Division. The Divisional Cavalry Regiment was formed to provide a reconnaissance force for the division. It was New Zealand's first armoured unit.

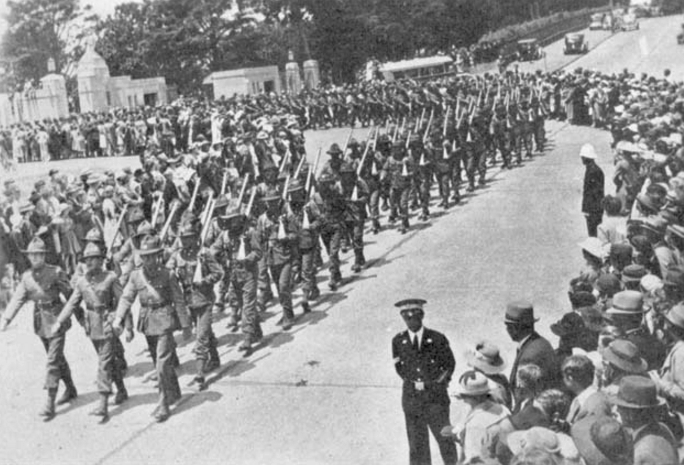
Regimental soldiers parading through Auckland Domain on 3 January 1940

The regiment was mobilised as part of 2 NZEF in September 1939 and was issued with six Bren gun carriers. It had a headquarters, a headquarters squadron and a machine-gun squadron; the structure was soon changed to conform with that of the British Divisional Cavalry Regiments, which included three fighting squadrons and a headquarters squadron. The regiment was established from 27 to 30 September at Ngāruawāhia Military Camp, except for No. 3 Squadron (later C Squadron), which was formed at Narrow Neck. It was commanded by Lieutenant Colonel Caro Pierce, a World War I veteran and Military Cross recipient. The squadrons at Ngāruawāhia were visited by Governor-General George Galway on 30 November. A special march through Auckland Domain was held on 3 January; the next day, the regiment (except for C Squadron) embarked for Egypt aboard the troopship RMS Rangitata. They arrived at Port Tewfik on 13 February. The regiment disembarked the following day and entrained for the New Zealand base camp at Maadi, the central depot and training area for 2 NZEF in the Middle East. In March, twelve Bren gun carriers and five Light Tanks Mark III arrived, and tank-gunnery training began on the range at Abbassia; the regiment participated in brigade manoeuvres at El Saff the following month. On 19 June, the regiment experienced its first fatality when Trooper Vincent Thompson died of meningitis.

C Squadron completed its training in New Zealand and was attached to the Second Echelon of the 2 NZEF, in adherence with plans to send one squadron of the regiment to Egypt with the Second Echelon. The squadron was diverted to Britain, while en route to Egypt, when Italy entered the war, and arrived on 16 June. The squadron was based near Aldershot and conducted further training there. C Squadron became part of the Second Echelon's Headquarters Covering Force, defending Britain against German invasion. In early September, the squadron was moved to Westwell, Kent; it underwent further training and was sent back to Aldershot in November. C Squadron left Britain for Egypt on 4 January 1941.

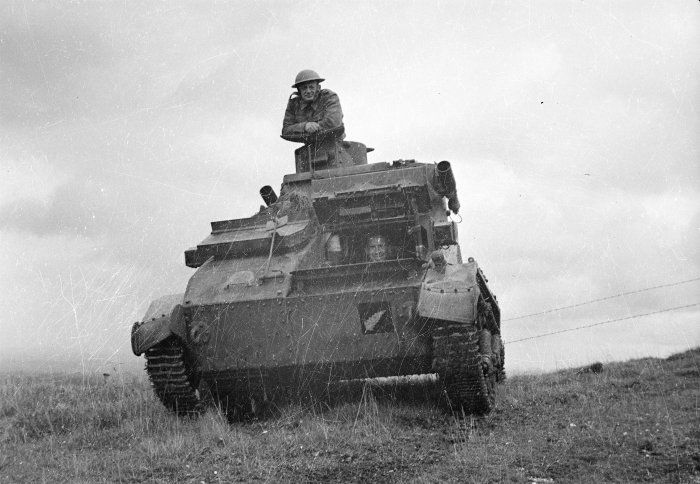
C Squadron tank during exercises in England

In July 1940, the 2nd New Zealand Division was sent to Mersa Matruh. The cavalry regiment, camped at Garawla, dug the outer anti-tank ditch along the Wadi Naghamish (later known as the Kiwi Canal). That month, volunteers from the regiment joined the Long Range Desert Patrol, and the regiment's base came under air attack. In the pre-dawn darkness of 15 July, Italian bombers attempting to bomb the NAAFI dump were driven off by anti-aircraft fire from the regiment. During the night of 18 July, regimental anti-aircraft guns mistakenly fired on a damaged Bristol Blenheim. The regiment received orders to move to Baggush and build fortifications, completing the move on 1 September; the following day, it began constructing defences at Maaten Baggush. After finishing the task within a week, it was transferred to the rear area at El Daba. The regiment defended No. 2 sector of the Baggush Box. After Operation Compass, the Allied offensive against Italian positions in Egypt and Libya, began on 9 December, several Italian Fiat M11/39 tanks were left behind at Nibeiwa. The regiment was ordered to salvage the tanks and on 15 December, Lieutenant H. A. Robinson led a party of 25 other ranks to Nibeiwa for the task. Div Cav received Marmon-Herrington Armoured Cars, replacing its obsolete Light Tanks Mk II and Mk III, and was transferred to Helwan in January 1941. The mortally ill Pierce was replaced by Lieutenant Colonel Hugh Carruth on 22 February and C Squadron joined the regiment at Helwan on 5 March.

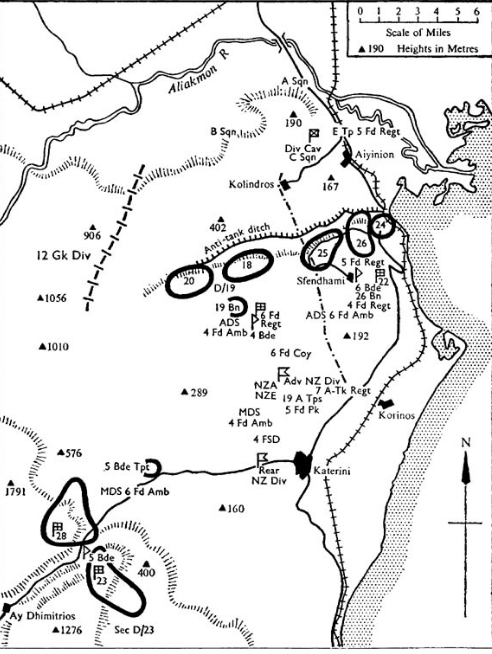
Positions of the New Zealand Division on the Aliakmon Line, 5 April 1941

== Greece ==
In early March 1941, the 2nd New Zealand Division (including Div Cav) was earmarked for W Force, the British Commonwealth force sent to Greece to bolster its defence against imminent German invasion. The regiment embarked for Greece on 18 March 1941 on the Greek ship Ionia, with its vehicles aboard the cargo ship Anglo-Canadian. The ships arrived at Piraeus on 21 March and the troops stayed at the transit camp at Kifisia. The regiment advanced northward, reaching its position on the Aliakmon Line near Katerini on 26 March. Its mission was to destroy the Aliakmon River bridges, delaying the German advance. E Troop of the 5th Field Regiment and O Troop of the 7th Anti-Tank Regiment were attached to the regiment. On 4 April, the regiment sent two troops of Marmon-Harrington armoured cars to reinforce the British 1st Armoured Brigade on the Macedonian plain; in exchange, the regiment received seven cruiser tanks. The two troops withdrew with the 1st Armoured Brigade when it retreated on 8 April and reached Perdikkas by the following day. The regiment and E Troop, 5th Field Regiment, were the only units left on the plain between Mount Olympus and the Aliakmon on 8 April. The next day, A Squadron demolished the main bridge across the Aliakmon, after the 1st Armoured Brigade had withdrawn southward.

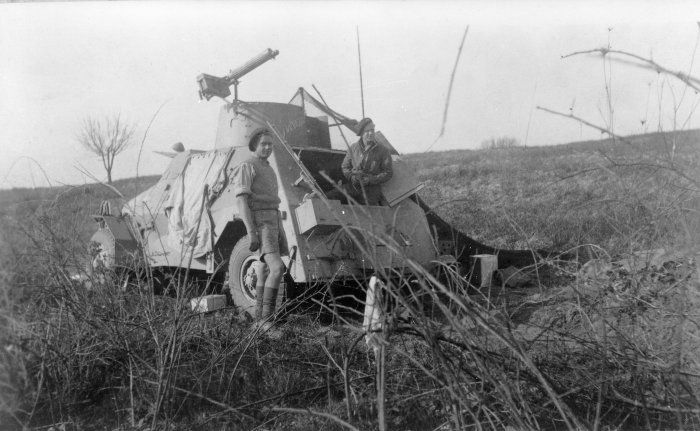
A Marmon-Herrington Mk I Armoured car similar to those used by the regiment during its withdrawal in Greece

German forces reached the regimental positions on 12 April; the following day, their attempts to cross the river in assault boats were repulsed. During the evening, the regiment disengaged and fell back to Kolindros; it was attacked by German tanks and infantry on 14 April. Boys anti-tank rifles were useless against the German tanks, although Bren gun fire was effective against the German infantry. When its positions were flanked by tanks, the regiment retreated to Olympus Pass and was ordered to take up positions at Deskati Pass as a rearguard. The pass, a possible withdrawal route for the 1st Armoured Brigade, was reached on 15 April. On the 17th, division commander Major General Bernard Freyberg dispersed the regiment to screen the rear of his retreating troops. The next day, A and C Squadrons withdrew from Olympus Pass and Eleftherochorion after a German tank attack. B Squadron fought a rearguard action at Tempe, retreating down the Volos road and losing several carriers.

The regiment, reunited on the Volos road, retreated to the Thermopylae Line. On 21 April it was ordered to patrol Euboea but its vehicles were too badly damaged to do so. The regiment, less A Squadron, was instructed instead to screen Kriekouki under Lieutenant Colonel Clifton, to cover the retreat of the 4th NZ Brigade; A Squadron was detached to screen the withdrawal of the 1st Armoured Brigade at Chalkis. By the evening of 25 April, Div Cav had fulfilled its mission and retreated beyond the village of Mazi. In the evening, Div Cav was ordered to guard the Corinth Canal bridge; A Squadron retreated with the 1st Armoured Brigade to Malakasa. A and B Squadrons retreated to Rafina Beach, embarking on the supply ship Glengyle. One hundred and fifty men from the regiment were left behind and were taken out by HMS Havock on the night of 27 April. C Squadron, caught in the German paratroop attack on Corinth, was forced to abandon its vehicles. It marched to Nafplion for embarkation but the ship they were scheduled to board was full and the squadron instead set off for Crete in caïques.

== Crete ==
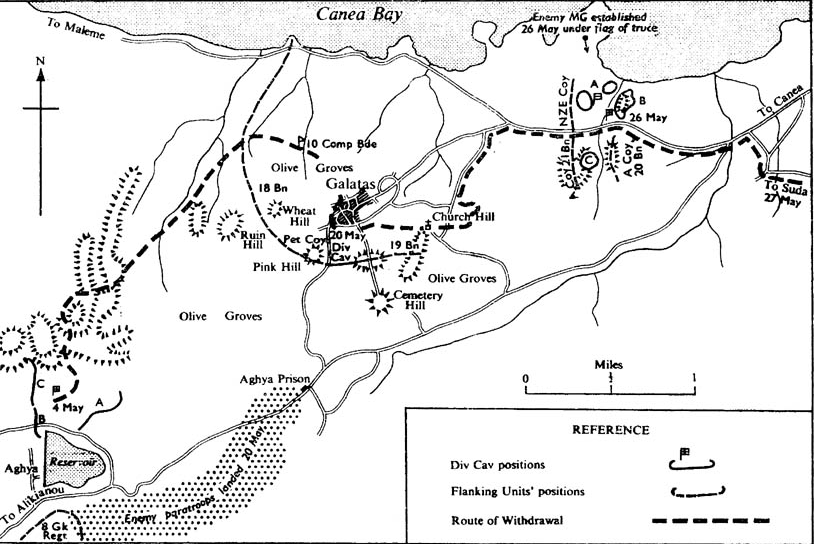
Div Cav positions in Crete

The evacuation of Greece divided the regiment: regimental headquarters and most of HQ Squadron were sent to Egypt and most of the other three squadrons remained on Crete. A total of 194 soldiers from the regiment were on the island, with several wounded men evacuated to Egypt; A, B and C Squadrons trained and re-equipped. The troops of the regiment on the island, commanded by Major J. T. Russell and renamed Russell Force, joined the ad-hoc 10th NZ Brigade under newly promoted Acting Colonel Howard Kippenberger and was positioned on the road from Chania to Alikianos. Russell Force was moved to Aghya in early May 1941.

German paratroops attacked Crete on 20 May. Many paratroopers landed near the Div Cav positions and were beaten back. Cut off from the 10th Brigade headquarters, Russell followed Kippenberger's orders and withdrew to Galatas in Chania, to reinforce a Greek unit south of the village. At dusk, the regiment dug in near a stone wall. B Squadron held the right flank and C Squadron the centre; A Squadron and the 19th Battalion held the left, with the Greek unit in reserve.

The brigade was strafed by German aircraft on the morning of 21 May. The 19th Battalion (supported by C Squadron and light tanks from the 3rd Hussars) assaulted Cemetery Hill, where two German machine guns threatened A and C Squadrons and part of the battalion. Although the Germans were driven off, the battalion could not hold under heavy mortar fire and withdrew; Cemetery Hill became a no man's land. On 25 May, heavy German attacks drove British forces from Wheat Hill and exposed the centre of the 18th Battalion, which withdrew through Galatas. The right flank of Div Cav and the Petrol Company, acting as infantry, was exposed and the 23rd Battalion counter-attacked and retook Galatas at dusk, withdrawing during the night. That night Div Cav retreated to Church Hill, behind the 19th Battalion. At 01:00 on 26 May the regiment joined remnants of the 21st Battalion commanded by Lieutenant Colonel Allen on the main coast road between Chania and Galatas on Hellfire Hill.

The force retreated by night to a position near Suda Bay, where the 21st Battalion took up positions on 42nd Street with Div Cav in reserve. The regiment fell back to Stilos, arriving at 04:00 on 28 May and formed the extreme right of a defensive position, with the 23rd Battalion on the left. During the afternoon it was ordered to withdraw through Vryses towards Sphakia. After reaching Sphakia on 31 May, the regiment was evacuated by HMS Abdiel to Egypt that night and during the early morning of 1 June. The regiment suffered a total of 130 casualties in Greece and Crete, including 61 captured and 17 killed.

== North Africa and Syria ==
=== Reorganisation and Operation Crusader ===
On 3 June, the units of the regiment that had fought on Crete arrived at Helwan. Major Arthur Nicoll received a promotion to lieutenant colonel and succeeded Carruth after the latter took command of the Composite Training Depot on 26 July. Fourteen Bren Gun Carriers arrived on 22 August 1941 and replacements were trained. In early September, the regiment prepared to move into the Western Desert to take part in the coming British offensive to raise the siege of Tobruk. An advance party, led by Major Russell, left Helwan on 14 September, and the regiment garrisoned the Baggush Box in September and October. In October, it received 26 Light Tanks Mk VI. During October, the regiment conducted maneuvers and training together with the 4 Infantry Brigade Group, using its new light tanks.

During Operation Crusader, it was planned that the New Zealand Division would cross the Egyptian border north of and parallel to XXX Corps and would then advance northwards. The offensive was to begin on 17 November. Prior to the beginning of the offensive, the regiment screened the Egyptian border south of Trigh el Abd to detect any German advance in that sector. In early November, Div Cav left Baggush to begin its pre-offensive mission and took the main road to Mersa Matruh (Matruh). It then took the Siwa road past Matruh, moving south for an hour before swinging west into the desert. The regiment bivouacked at dusk and continued in stages the following day. Lieutenant Colonel Nicoll visited the 4th Indian Division headquarters on 9 November. Regimental Headquarters, B and C Squadrons were brought under command of the 4th Indian Division, advancing to Alam el Seneini the next day. A Squadron continued 10 mi (16 km) and was taken under the command of the 4th South African Armoured Car Regiment, with the HQ Squadron 12 mi (19 km) behind along with the B Echelon of the South Africans. A troop of the 65th Anti-Tank Regiment and a troop of the 57th Light Anti-Aircraft Regiment (57th LAA) were placed under Div Cav. The 57th LAA shot down an Italian aircraft at El Rabta on 14 November.

At dusk on 17 November, Regimental HQ and A Squadron advanced to El Beida; C Squadron bivouacked at El Rabta and B Squadron screened the 7th Indian Infantry Brigade as it advanced towards Bir Gibni. C Squadron crossed the frontier towards Bir Gibni the following day, joined by Regimental Headquarters and A Squadron later in the morning. B Squadron patrolled the Indian brigade's flank near Bir Gibni and was fired on by German Panzer III tanks. One Panzer III was disabled by 2-pounder anti-tank guns, and was towed away by a retreating Panzer. B Squadron pulled back a mile at night and laagered. At 15:00 on 19 November, the regiment advanced towards Bir Gibni, with C Squadron forward and A Squadron in reserve. C Squadron reached the Trigh el Abd and observed the British 4th Armoured Brigade fighting a battle group from the 21st Panzer Division. B Squadron was transferred back to regimental command late on 19 November, after providing flank support to the 7th Indian Brigade.

On the morning of 20 November, B Squadron patrolled in front of the 4th Indian Division and captured a German car and its passenger. C Squadron patrolled closer to Bir Gibni, observing the tank battles in that area. XIII Corps began driving north the following day; Div Cav advanced to Sidi Azeiz, capturing 49 Italians from the 52nd Anti-Aircraft Battery and six German and Italian artillerymen. After the engagement at Sidi Azeiz, the regiment formed a line at Bir ez Zemla. The 4th New Zealand Infantry Brigade arrived the next day; the 20th Battalion attacked enemy positions, while C Squadron captured several Italian machine-gun posts. A Squadron captured three grounded German aircraft, taking prisoners, and B Squadron captured five ambulance cars with their drivers. On the evening of 22 November, the regimental line was taken over by units of the 5th New Zealand Infantry Brigade and C Squadron was transferred to the command of the 4th Infantry Brigade for its advance on Gambut; the rest of Div Cav moved to Sidi Azeiz.

==== C Squadron at Gambut and Ed Duda ====
C Squadron, leading a brigade group, advanced towards Gambut on the morning of 23 November. On the outskirts of Gambut, the line was stopped to allow the Matilda tanks to lead the column. C Squadron was ordered to charge into Gambut, but when it became apparent that the Axis was retreating, they pursued until the New Zealand infantry engaged and then withdrew to Gambut aerodrome. The following evening, the squadron screened the 4th Brigade Group and advanced westward before being recalled at dusk. On 25 November, C Squadron screened the brigade in its advance on Sidi Rezegh and captured a number of German soldiers before being sent to guard divisional headquarters. Four Stuart tanks, captured from the British by the Germans and then recaptured, were given to C Squadron on the afternoon of 27 November.

The next day, the squadron patrolled the Sidi Rezegh and Gambut escarpments, driving off German tanks and infantry in the afternoon and incurring vehicle and crew losses. The German column turned north during the night, attacking the divisional headquarters from the east. The four Stuart tanks repulsed the assault; 2 and 5 Troops attempted to regain the New Zealand field hospital, which had been captured the night before. They withdrew, narrowly escaping encirclement by German tanks from the 15th Panzer Division. When the remnants of the 21st Battalion were destroyed on Point 175, the New Zealand Division rear was shelled. The Italian Ariete Armoured Division attacked on 30 November and were repulsed by the divisional artillery. During the afternoon, the 24th Battalion and most of the 26th were overrun by the 15th Panzer Division.

On 1 December, the Germans overran the 20th Battalion and split the 19th in half, cutting off the 18th Battalion. The remnants of the 6th New Zealand Infantry Brigade fell back through the 4th New Zealand Infantry Brigade to Zaafran and the Ed Duda corridor was closed. The division retreated, led along the Trigh Capuzzo by C Squadron, which halted at Bir Gibni at 04:00 on 2 December. At noon, the squadron headed north to rejoin the regiment.

==== Regiment at Bardia ====
B and C Squadrons were ordered to patrol Sidi Azeiz on 24 November, linking the 22nd and 23rd Battalion positions and screening the brigade against an expected German assault on 25 November. On the morning of 26 November, several German transport vehicles were captured when they ran into the B Squadron laager. The squadrons patrolled the line, capturing prisoners before withdrawing from a German attack on 27 November. After the brigade headquarters was captured, the regiment set off to join the 7th Indian Infantry Brigade at Sidi Omar Nuovo, moving to Bir Zemla to cut Bardia's communications from the west on 1–3 December. On 3 December, an Axis column approached; the regiment retreated, leading the Axis into an ambush by the 28th Maori Battalion and 22nd Infantry Battalion. C Squadron arrived on 6 December and the squadrons screened at Menastir. On 7 December, the regiment split into four mobile columns and moved west, discovering 29 tanks in a wadi near the coast. Two days later A and C Squadrons and three anti-tank gun batteries attacked the area, a tank-repair workshop, destroying the tanks and taking 30 prisoners.

From 10 to 16 December, the regiment established a chain of posts on the roads south of Bardia to prevent Axis movement. The 2nd South African Division, supported by A and C Squadrons, made an abortive attack on Bardia on 16 December; the 2nd South African battalions retreated two days later. The regiment participated in a deception operation, concealing the attack on Bardia with dummy tanks in the desert. On 2 January 1942, Lieutenant E. W. Kerr of the regiment accepted the surrender of German General Artur Schmitt, commander of the Bardia garrison. C Squadron became the first Allied force to enter Bardia. HQ and B Squadrons entered Bardia after Kerr's troop, releasing Allied prisoners. On 6 January, the regiment left Bardia for Baggush, returning to Maadi on 26 January.

=== Syria and Rommel's second offensive ===
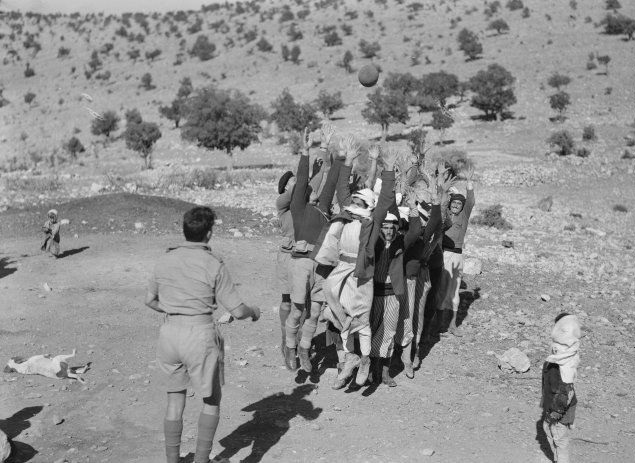
Div Cav soldiers playing rugby with Syrian civilians

On 13 March, the New Zealand Division moved to Syria to build fortifications in the Beqaa Valley, to protect against the prospect of an Axis attack from Turkey. The regiment had to build roads at Laboue and Wadi Fa'rah, camping at Djedeida. In mid-May the road-building was finished and the regiment prepared for manoeuvres with the 4th and 6th New Zealand Infantry Brigades. On 21 May, the regiment moved into the desert for the manoeuvres. When the exercises were completed on 1 June, it returned to Djedeida for more training.

On 16 June, the Div Cav was ordered to move to Egypt with the rest of the division. The offensive by General Erwin Rommel had created a need for more troops to stop the Axis advance. The regiment arrived at Matruh ten days later, where it was to cover the northern and eastern parts of the minefields around the village. Div Cav was the last of the divisional units to arrive back in Egypt. When the division left Matruh on 26 June, the regiment's tanks and carriers had not yet arrived. B Squadron was equipped with carriers and transport available in Matruh and was sent ahead to Garawla, losing two carriers to tanks along the way and splitting up in the darkness. Half went to Minqar Qaim, where the 4th and 5th New Zealand Infantry Brigades were positioned, and the other half, led by Major Sutherland, laagered in a depression and was surrounded by German tanks. Sutherland's force broke out, losing one soldier who was taken prisoner. Arriving at headquarters at 08:00, he found the rest of the squadron. B Squadron was then sent to Bir Khalda to replace the 21st Battalion, patrolling there for the rest of the day. By evening the division was nearly surrounded, so acting division commander Brigadier Inglis decided on a breakout to Fortress A (also known as the Kaponga Box) south-west of El Alamein. B Squadron retreated south along the Qattara Depression before turning north to the fortress, rejoining the regiment on 30 June.

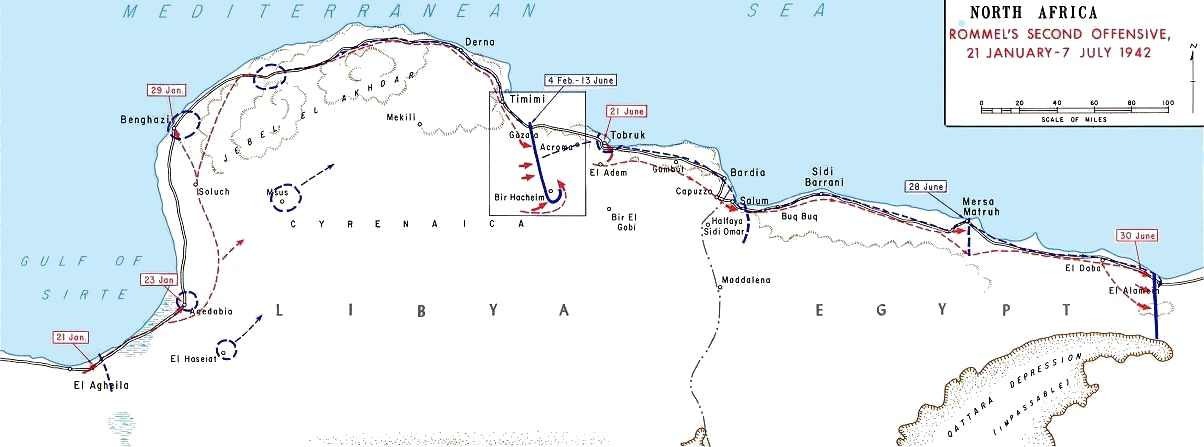
A map of Rommel's second offensive

The remainder of Div Cav left Matruh for Fuka on 27 June, receiving new Bren Gun Carriers at Baggush. A Squadron prepared the new carriers for battle. After a report of approaching Axis tanks, the squadrons were withdrawn to Daba on 28 June and to Fortress A in the afternoon. On 30 June, the regiment screened west and south of the box. From 1 July, the regiment fought in the First Battle of El Alamein. B Squadron was shelled on 1 July and withdrew to the Deir el Munassib. The regiment probed ahead of the box, engaging the Axis forces, and B Squadron lost a carrier to anti-tank guns on the Alam Nayil ridge. The Axis forces were halted by a New Zealand counter-attack led by Brigadier Weir. Alam Nayil was captured by Weir's force on 3 July and C Squadron held the ridge while Weir's force pressed ahead. After the Italian guns on the ridge were destroyed, C Squadron withdrew and came under fire from Ruweisat Ridge. On 3 July, A Squadron reconnoitred around Gebel Kalakh and was ineffectually shelled by the friendly 6th Field Regiment. Two troops from A Squadron engaged an Italian truck-mounted battalion of the Trieste Division, destroying two trucks, capturing one Italian and releasing three Indian PoWs.

On 4 July, as part of a divisional attack toward Daba, the regiment was ordered to send C squadron north-west to join the 5th New Zealand Infantry Brigade at El Mreir and continue to Daba. The squadron was ambushed on its way to El Mreir at 07:15; two carriers were destroyed and C Squadron was replaced by two troops from B Squadron shortly afterwards. During the afternoon, A and C Squadrons set out towards Daba but halted when night fell. A Squadron approached Mungar Wahla on 5 July but withdrew to Qaret el Yidma after heavy artillery fire. A and B Squadrons patrolled the 4th New Zealand Infantry Brigade front on 6 July. The next day, the division again attempted to drive toward the coast, after an all-clear report. B Squadron screened the 4th and 5th New Zealand Infantry Brigades before being halted by Axis fire and A and C Squadrons were ordered into the line to reconnoitre. Axis tanks attacking C Squadron during the afternoon were repulsed by the 4th New Zealand Infantry Brigade anti-tank guns. Div Cav, the rearguard for the 4th and 5th New Zealand Infantry Brigade retreat, reached Deir el Munassib on the morning of 8 July and received 15 Stuarts. A Squadron patrolled the front of the 22nd Battalion during the afternoon, returning to Deir el Munassib at night. The regiment screened the front on 9–10 July, covering the 5th New Zealand Infantry Brigade night retreat.

A and C Squadrons supported a costly, abortive 15 July attack on Ruweisat Ridge and the regiment retreated as the division dug in at the boxes. Two troops were dispatched to join the 18th Battalion on 22 July, encountering an Axis pocket and losing a troop commander. The regiment was incorporated into the New Zealand Divisional box; A and C Squadrons dug in, and B Squadron patrolled south. On 17 and 18 August, A and C Squadrons were relieved by the Buffs and Royal West Kents and moved out.

=== Battle of Alam Halfa ===
The regiment fought in the Battle of Alam el Halfa, during an attempted German thrust towards the Nile Delta. On 31 August, the regiment was alerted to the coming attack. B Squadron blocked a German advance through the box minefield, retreating after it was flanked, and two troops from A Squadron drove off eight Italian Fiat M13/40 tanks. Later in the morning ten Axis tanks with two 88 mm guns attacked from the Deir el Muhafid and were repulsed by the 26th Battery artillery. The regiment patrolled the northern flank on 3 September and became the mobile reserve during the New Zealand Division attack on the retreating Axis line. It was to follow the 132nd Infantry Brigade and advance to Deir Alinda, to destroy Axis motorised transport, but the brigade was stopped and the regiment withdrew to the box.

=== Battle of El Alamein ===
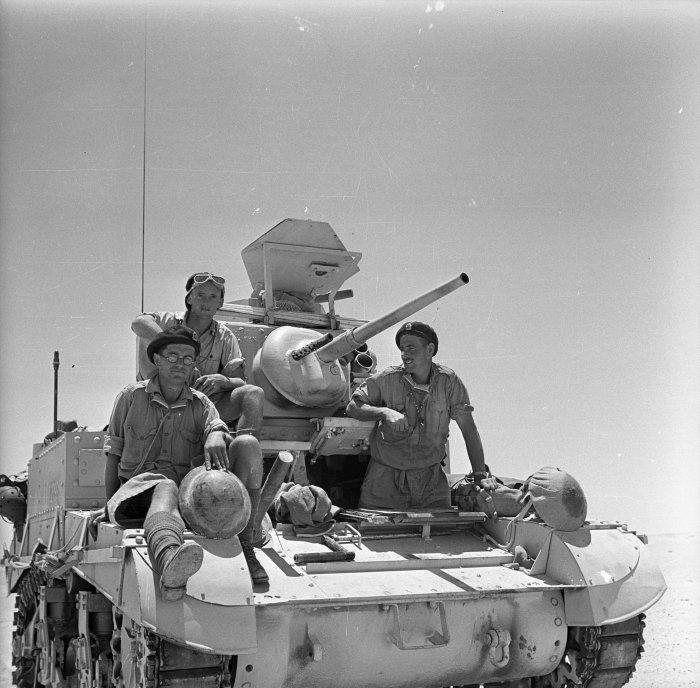
Div Cav soldiers on a Stuart tank during the First Battle of El Alamein

Div Cav moved rearward on 10 September for leave in Cairo. The regiment conducted manoeuvres with the division in September and returned to Burg el Arab. Colonel Nicoll was beaten up on 5 October by drunken soldiers in Maadi, where he had gone to arrange replacements, and was replaced by Lieutenant Colonel James Sutherland. A total of 23 carriers with new equipment arrived from workshops on 11 October. The regiment advanced to El Hammam on 19 October in preparation for Operation Lightfoot, the first Allied attack in the Second Battle of El Alamein; it was notified the following day of plans to attack the Axis rear behind the armoured brigade, advancing to El Imayid. On 22 October, Div Cav moved to its starting position at Alam el Onsol.

The advance began at night on 23 October, with the regiment advancing down a track during the artillery barrage. At daybreak, Div Cav stopped at Miteiriya Ridge because the 6th New Zealand Infantry Brigade was unable to clear lanes through the minefield. A gap was created in the evening and B and C Squadrons advanced, screening the 9th Armoured Brigade. After traversing the minefield, the squadrons were stopped by anti-tank fire. Ten men were killed, and five tanks and four carriers destroyed.

The next day, the regiment was withdrawn and became part of the divisional reserve at Alam el Onsol. Orders arrived for an advance on 30 October for Operation Supercharge, planned as the final attack of the battle. The regiment was placed under the command of the 9th Armoured Brigade on 1 November, with each squadron attached to an armoured unit. A Squadron was attached to the 3rd Hussars, C Squadron to the Warwickshire Yeomanry and B Squadron to the Royal Wiltshire Yeomanry. The assault began the following day, with the squadrons ordered to screen the minefields for the armoured brigade. The 3rd Hussars reached the Rahman track, losing their anti-tank guns. The Wiltshire Yeomanry lost a Crusader squadron to anti-tank fire and was nearly destroyed by the end of the day. Four B Squadron men were killed by anti-tank fire as the squadron advanced behind the Wiltshires. The Warwickshires, mistaking high ground for their objective, destroyed several anti-tank guns there. At the end of the day the regiment, except for C Squadron, returned to Alam el Onsol.

Div Cav resumed the offensive on 4 November, advancing south-west against retreating Axis forces and ending the day at Agramiya. The regiment advanced on the northern flank of the New Zealand Division the next day, screening the division at the recaptured Baggush Box on 6 November. It then set off towards Mersa Matruh on the coast road and the escarpment, in contact with the 9th Armoured Brigade. The regiment halted at Gambut on 13 November, moving east to Menastir six days later.

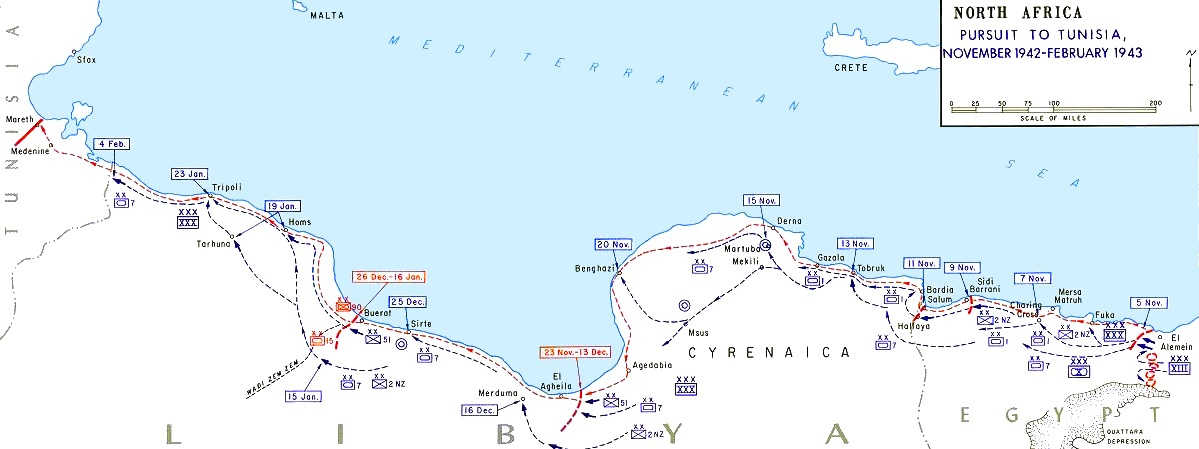
Allied advance in North Africa, November 1942 to February 1943

=== Battle of El Agheila ===
Div Cav spent the first three weeks of the pursuit camped near Bardia. On 2 December, as part of the outflanking move around El Agheila, the regiment began an eight-day drive on transporters to El Haseiat. After unloading its vehicles, the regiment continued its flanking movement. On 14 December, it was placed under the command of the 4th Light Armoured Brigade, with which it spent the night. C Squadron screened the brigade in the morning and by 16:00 the regiment had drawn away from the brigade as C Squadron reached the escarpment. The German 15th Panzer Division, halted on the road due to a fuel shortage, was targeted by Div Cav. During the night, the regiment withdrew and laagered while the Germans retreated. At 05:45 the next morning, XXX Corps headquarters ordered the division to attack the Germans and the regiment was advised to expect an attack from the east by a hundred tanks. Div Cav was ordered to withdraw south-west, along the line of its previous advance. When the regiment had gone back 6 mi (9.7 km), it surprised a German column. A Squadron engaged, as the other squadrons hastily withdrew. In the evening, the regiment advanced a mile west and laagered.

On 17 December, Div Cav guarded the northern flank of the brigade in its advance on Nofilia; B and C Squadrons engaged the German rearguard, knocking out one Panzer III and losing two carriers. The brigade failed to capture Nofilia; although it cut the road, the Germans escaped during the night. The regiment was scheduled to camp at Nofilia for a week, with C Squadron dispatched to guard the airfield at Sultan with a detachment of engineers to clear mines. The minefield was cleared by 23 December, when A Squadron replaced C Squadron. In late December, 18 new carriers arrived and the regiment prepared for another advance.

=== Advance on Tripoli ===
On 8 and 9 January 1943, Div Cav advanced again. The A Squadron vehicles at Nofilia were loaded on transporters, which drove down the main road while the rest of the regiment screened the New Zealand Division advance. The A Squadron vehicles were unloaded near Wadi Bei el Chebir, east of the expected German rearguard near Wadi Temet, and the regiment caught up on 14 January. The following day, A Squadron crossed the road and withstood shelling by anti-tank guns and artillery until the afternoon. B Squadron probed south, also encountering German anti-tank guns. After one of its Stuart tanks knocked out an anti-tank gun, B Squadron advanced through the German line, dislodging anti-tank guns and destroying a Sd.Kfz. 250 half-track. During the afternoon, C Squadron failed to break through the German centre but that night the Germans withdrew. On 16 January, the regiment advanced to high ground above the airstrip at Sedada, losing a tank and carrier. C Squadron advanced down the plateau in the darkness, losing a carrier to a mine on the trail. The regiment found an alternate route, ending the day in Wadi Merdum. On 18 January, Div Cav advanced through rugged country to Beni Ulid. The regiment advanced towards Tarhuna the following day, bivouacking halfway there, before discovering a route through the hills north of the road.

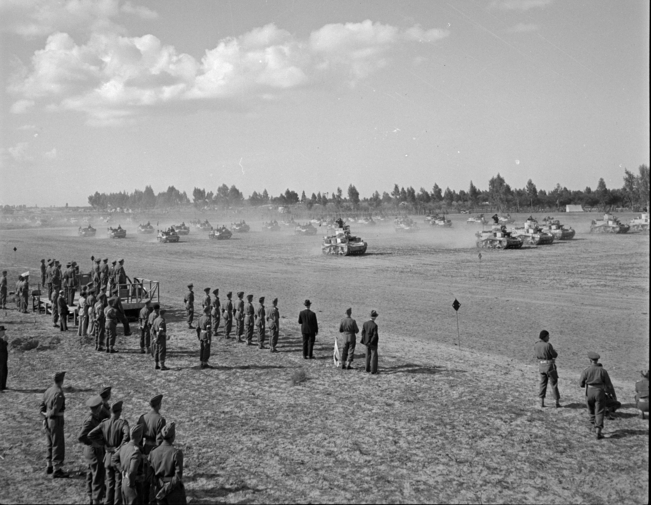
The regiment being reviewed by Churchill and other dignitaries

On 21 January, Div Cav moved out of the hills, with C Squadron artillery driving off German rearguards. Next morning A and B Squadrons advanced west, turning north after crossing the Garian road, before they were halted by German resistance at Azizia. The Germans retreated during the night and the regiment found an empty village in the morning. Racing down the road, Div Cav ended the day 4 mi (6.4 km) from Tripoli before being transferred to Bianchi for a week. The regiment next encamped around Castel Benito. On 28 January, Lieutenant Colonel Sutherland left for New Zealand and was replaced by Ian Bonifant. In February, the regiment unloaded supplies from landing craft in Tripoli. On the 4th, the Eighth Army paraded through the city in front of Winston Churchill, Bernard Montgomery, Richard McCreery and Freyberg.

=== Tunisia ===
The Divisional Cavalry Regiment left Castel Benito on 2 March as part of the attack on the Mareth Line. On 3 March the regiment was in Tunisia, camped near the road at Medenine. The next morning it was put under command of the 4th Light Armoured Brigade, in preparation for a German assault, and moved forward, behind the 5th New Zealand Brigade positions. After the Axis repulse, A Squadron was sent south to probe the eastern end of the hills while B and C Squadrons harassed the German retreat on 7 March. The regiment patrolled the area between the 11th Hussars and the Free French Flying Column for the next five days and moved back to Foum Tatahouine on 13 March, where the New Zealand Division assembled for a flanking movement inland. Div Cav advanced south-west and then north, guarding the divisional right flank. On 21 March, contact was made with the Germans and elements of the division attacked during the night. C Squadron advanced behind the infantry in the morning before being stopped by shellfire near Point 201, a battlefield elevation. As the shelling decreased, A and HQ Squadrons advanced to the C Squadron position. B Squadron arrived from night patrol, and the regiment laagered behind Point 201. On the morning of 23 March, B and C Squadrons advanced, capturing fifteen 77 mm guns and several prisoners. From 24 to 26 March, the regiment patrolled the left flank of the line in preparation for an assault by the 1st Armoured Division. When close air support preparation for the assault began, Div Cav marked the bomb line with smoke canisters and advanced on the flank when the ground assault began. The regiment laagered next to the Kebili-El Hamma road during the night.

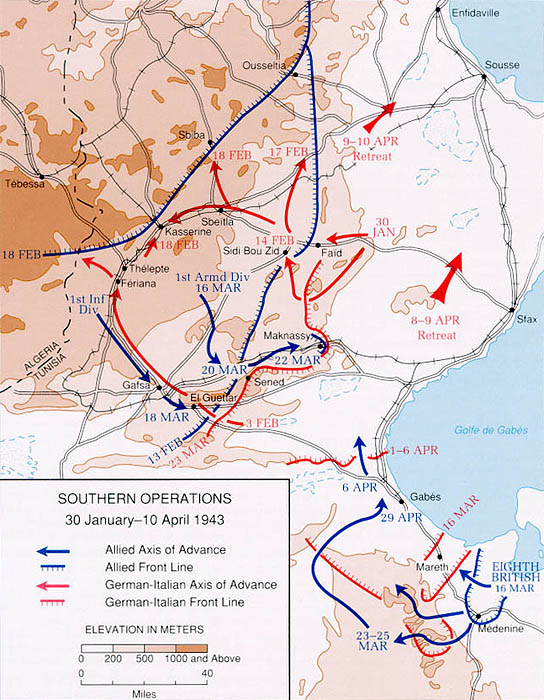
The campaign in Tunisia, 10 January to 10 April 1943

On 27 March, B and C Squadrons made contact with the 1st Armoured Division. The next day, the regiment maintained contact with the retreating Germans, entering Gabes the following day. Div Cav stopped at a wadi to determine where the division could cross on a nine-vehicle front. A location was found on 30 March and C Squadron pressed ahead near the Wadi Akarit. The wadi was strongly defended; the regiment patrolled and probed until 5 April, before an attack by XXX Corps infantry in which the 2nd New Zealand would be in reserve. The assault did not break through the Axis resistance on the first day but succeeded on the second morning and the division pursued. The regiment advanced with the division, capturing 1,300 PoWs. On 8 April, it became part of a battlegroup consisting of the 8th Armoured and 5th New Zealand Infantry Brigades and the 1st King's Dragoon Guards (KDG). The regiment advanced another 20 mi (32 km), halting in the afternoon. Resuming its advance that evening, it reached the head of the division late at night. Div Cav guarded the eastern flank the following day, with orders not to attack substantial German forces. The advance towards Sousse resumed on 10 April, with A and B Squadrons reaching El Djem. The regiment, pursuing the retreating Germans at dawn, was past Sousse by 08:30. As A Squadron advanced up the main road, B and C Squadrons swung west. The regiment was within 10 mi (16 km) of Enfidaville by 13 April and probed the German positions until the 19th.

Div Cav was withdrawn on 24 April and was sent back to a rest area two days later. The regiment moved forward west of Enfidaville on 4 May, moving near the town on 8 May, to exploit a breakthrough by tanks the following day. The breakthrough was forestalled by the First Army drive across Tunisia, and the Axis forces in North Africa surrendered on 13 May. Three days later, the regiment began moving back to Maadi, arriving on 1 June. At Maadi the regiment received replacements, while some personnel who had served with the first three echelons received three-month leaves in New Zealand. On 5 July, new personal weapons were issued and the regiment began training on the rifle and light machine gun ranges. A month later the regiment was one of the first units equipped with Staghound armoured cars. Five troops in each squadron received T17s and one troop in each was equipped with a Daimler Dingo Scout Car. On 17 September, the regiment moved to Burg el Arab and began embarking for Italy. By 1 November its equipment had arrived and the regiment moved up to Altamura.

== Italy ==
After the Allied invasion of Italy in early September, the Eighth Army advanced rapidly. By the middle of October the army was on the line of Termoli, Campobasso and Vinchiaturo. German resistance had stiffened in the last stages of the advance. The Fifth Army captured Naples on 1 October and then crossed the Volturno against strong German resistance. By this point the Allies had run up against the fortifications of the Winter Line. The 15th Army Group commander Harold Alexander revised the plan for the winter, which involved the capture of the high ground north of Pescara after crossing the Trigno, Sangro and Pescara rivers. The Fifth Army would advance up the Liri Valley and when both armies were close to Rome, an amphibious operation would be launched south of the Tiber. To prepare for the offensive, the Allies advanced through the outlying Winter Line defences. The Eighth Army crossed the Trigno in late October and Montgomery planned to advance along the coast road to Pescara, which was the most defended route. Montgomery considered his four infantry divisions too weak to break the line without reinforcement.

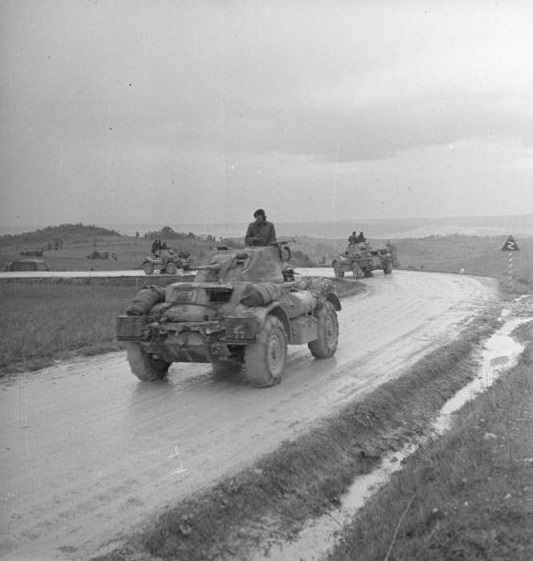
Staghound armoured cars from the regiment on an Italian road, 19 November 1943

Div Cav became part of the Eighth Army reserve along with the rest of the 2nd New Zealand Division and was positioned several miles north of Lucera, near the Foggia Airfield Complex, on 4 November. On 12 November, the regiment left Lucera for the front, arriving at Cupello in the afternoon to guard a bridge over the Sinello River below the village of Gissi. At 09:00 the next day, the regiment moved out to its new position, 20 mi (32 km) forward; the trip took all day, through sleet and mountainous terrain. A Squadron guarded the bridge, while the rest of the regiment bivouacked. On 18 November, B Squadron guarded the left flank of the division, south-west of Atessa. C and HQ Squadrons advanced 10 mi (16 km) forward to the village of Monte Marcone on 20 November, and A and B Squadrons were sent back to Carpineto Sinello in reserve. C Squadron made contact with the British V Corps on foot, since the road was demolished in three places.

=== Advance across the Sangro ===
In the planned offensive on the Sangro, C Squadron was to follow the 19th Armoured Regiment in its advance at 03:00. Although its tanks reached the river, they bogged down in the mud and the squadron remained on the other bank as B Squadron advanced to Monte Marconi. Three troops from C Squadron finally crossed the river by the afternoon of 29 November; one was ordered to advance to Elici and a second was to make contact with the 8th Indian Infantry Division at La Defenza. The routes were mined and the troops spent the night at 23rd Battalion headquarters. In the morning, the mines were cleared and the second troop contacted the Indians and advanced east of Elici; the first troop was held up by shelling south of Elici.

Three troops from B Squadron tried to probe Casoli but failed since the bridges over the river had been destroyed; a foot patrol formed from the squadron was sent. C Squadron advanced forward of Elici after it was abandoned by the Axis. The New Zealand Engineers constructed a Bailey bridge over the river, allowing B Squadron to cross on 1 December. The squadron attempted to capture Guardiagrele the next day but was repulsed by anti-tank gunfire. Two troops from C Squadron entered Castelfrentano, joining the tanks of the 18th Armoured Regiment. On 4 December, A and B Squadrons attempted to find a way through Frisa, working to the right for an easier approach towards Arielli. The division was to attack on the Orsogna road and contain the 26th Panzer Division. On 1 January 1944, B Squadron was sent forward as infantry to take over the sector between San Eusanio and Guardiagrele. It was relieved on 19 January and the regiment moved back over the Sangro to another sector.

=== Battle of Monte Cassino ===
To divert German troops from the Anzio landings (Operation Shingle), the Fifth Army was ordered to advance towards Cassino and Frosinone before 22 January, D-Day for the operation. To provide a reserve for the army group, the 2nd New Zealand Division was withdrawn to the Naples area. The division became part of the ad hoc New Zealand Corps after its reinforcement by the 4th Indian Division and the regiment was posted above the Volturno River around the village of Raviscanina. Arriving on 22 January, it moved forward to an assembly area at Stazione di Toro on 6 February. The Fifth Army advance had stalled and the 2nd New Zealand Division moved into the line. Three days later the regiment replaced the 21st Battalion on the Gari river, opposite Sant'Angelo. On 15 February, the Benedictine monastery on Monte Cassino was bombed and two days later the Maori Battalion attacked the Cassino railway station. There was only enough space for a two-company advance, so Divisional Cavalry and 24th Battalion machine-gunned and mortared the area to their front to create the impression of a larger attack. The regiment laid down a mortar barrage on its front to screen the Maoris with smoke. The Maori Battalion advanced to the railway station but was forced back over the Rapido in the late afternoon. Div Cav moved out of the line to Monte Trocchio on 23 February and was relieved by the 1st Battalion, East Surrey Regiment from the British 78th Division. On 15 March, the Monte Cassino assault resumed, and C Squadron kept the Route 6 bridge over the Gari-Rapido shrouded from German observation with smoke. The regiment pulled out of the line on 20 March, taking up the new left flank of New Zealand Division along the Gari River and was relieved on 9 April by the 22nd Battalion.

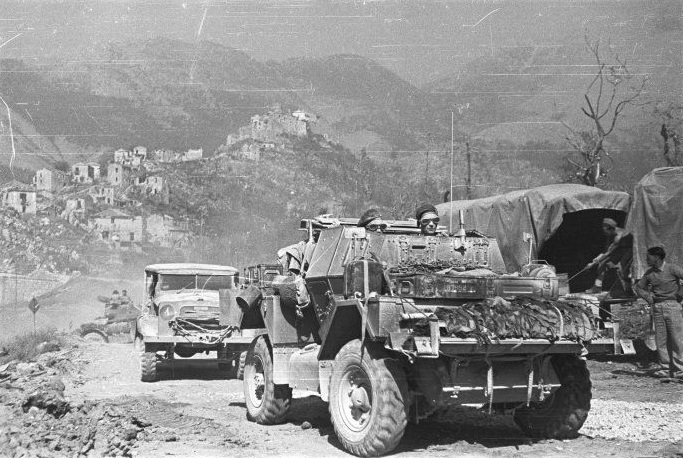
Div Cav Daimler Dingo near Atina

Div Cav rested near Filignano and Montaquila. Two troops from C Squadron were positioned along the Venafro–Atina road and the rest of the regiment built the road between Filignano and Montaquila. On 18 April, Bonifant left for New Zealand on furlough and was replaced by his second-in-command, Major Nicholas Wilder. On 10 May, the final offensive against the Gustav Line began; the regiment was combined with the 22nd and 24th Battalions and No. 2 Company of the 27th Machine Gun Battalion to become Pleasants Force, to take over positions held by the Kimberley Rifles. On the night of 11 May, the final battle for Monte Cassino began. The French Expeditionary Corps outflanked the German defences in an advance along the Aurunci Mountains. The 78th Infantry Division advanced to Route 6 and on the right of the Eighth Army the II Polish Corps captured Monte Cassino. The Gustav Line was soon broken through and Allied troops in the Anzio beachhead conducted a breakout. By 26 May, the Axis was retreating; the regiment retrieved its vehicles and drove up the valley to Atina, passing through during the evening before it was stopped by opposition at Vicalvi. Three days later Vicalvi was captured by the 21st Battalion and the regiment advanced through the town. Since the bridge over the Fibreno River had been destroyed, B Squadron guarded the site while two troops found their way across and provided a flank guard for the Maori Battalion. C Squadron remained in Vicalvi on 31 May and A Squadron held Posta until it was replaced by the RAF Regiment. B Squadron moved up to Sora when the bridge was completed. On 1 June, B Squadron advanced toward Isola del Liri, which was captured by the 8th Indian Infantry Division. A Squadron was transferred to the 5th New Zealand Infantry Brigade to advance with it in pursuit, while the rest of the regiment laagered on the Fibreno. Allied troops rapidly advanced and Rome was captured on 4 June.

=== Advance to Florence ===
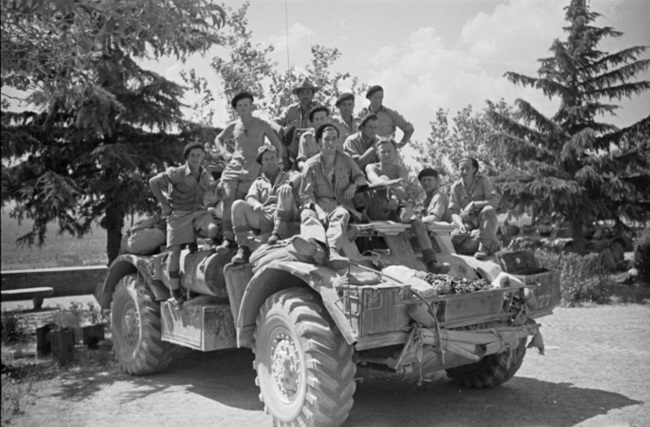
Regimental Staghound in Castiglione, 16 July 1944

On 5 June, the main part of the regiment was combined with two companies of infantry and a squadron of tanks to form Wilder Force, which was to take over the front from the 5th New Zealand Infantry Brigade. A Squadron pushed up the valley and Wilder Force advanced behind, through Balsorano. After the Axis retreated to their next line of defence, the New Zealand Division withdrew to Arce for training. The regiment moved forward again on 10 July, advancing to Cortona on 11–12 July. B Squadron was transferred to 6th New Zealand Infantry Brigade and sent forward to Castiglion Fiorentino to clear the road between Castiglion and Palazzo del Pero. The road was opened by the 6th Armoured Division, and the crossroads on Route 73 was reached on 15 July. The New Zealand Division moved to capture Florence; the regiment advanced west to Siena and then turned north to Castellina. A Squadron supported the 23rd and 28th Battalions advancing on San Casciano and the remainder of the regiment arrived at San Donato by 22 July. Two days later, C Squadron combined with A Squadron of the 19th Armoured Brigade, No. 2 Company of the 22nd Battalion and 1st Troop of the 31st Anti-tank Battery to form Armcav. The force advanced on 25 July, taking Fabbrica and advancing toward Bibbione. Bibbione was taken despite determined opposition the next day and the other two squadrons supported the Maori Battalion. Armcav was disbanded on 27 July and C Squadron remained under the command of the 4th Armoured Brigade.

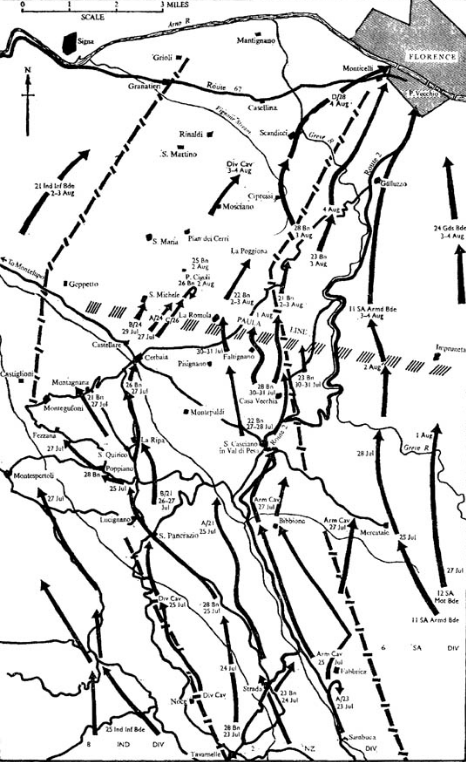
A map of the Allied advance to Florence

San Casciano was captured shortly afterwards and the final assault on Florence began on 1 August. A Squadron was in reserve and B Squadron patrolled northward. C Squadron advanced on Geppetto, covering the left flank of the 6th New Zealand Infantry Brigade. Geppetto was captured the next morning and C Squadron patrolled forward to San Michele. B Squadron advanced with the Maori Battalion, ending the day and advancing the next morning with that unit. C Squadron moved west on Route 67 until it was halted by opposition near Grioli and A Squadron advanced to Scandicci in the afternoon as Florence fell.

=== Gothic Line ===
The New Zealand Division was temporarily relieved and to cover its replacement by the US Fifth Army, B Squadron was attached to the 4th New Zealand Infantry Brigade, C Squadron to the 5th New Zealand Infantry and A Squadron to the 6th New Zealand Infantry. On the morning of 11 August, C Squadron supported the 23rd Battalion advance from Emboli to the Arno River. B Squadron was positioned in San Vito and A Squadron behind the Pesa River. The regiment withdrew to the divisional area near Castellina on 16 August, moving with the division to Iesi on the Adriatic. Arriving on 29 August, it was transferred to Fano on 5 September. The regiment moved back into the line on 22 September at Rimini, advancing along Route 16 towards Ravenna. On 29 September, all armoured cars were recalled due to heavy rain and poor visibility. Wilder Force was re-formed on 3 October from the dismounted regiment and a machine-gun platoon and it began crossing the Fiumicino River on 15 October. Four days later, Wilder Force was dissolved and the regiment returned to its vehicles. On 21 October, B and C Squadrons attempted to secure the area around Pisignano and were within a mile of the town by the end of the day. Since it was strongly held by the Axis, the 22nd Battalion came forward and the squadrons withdrew.

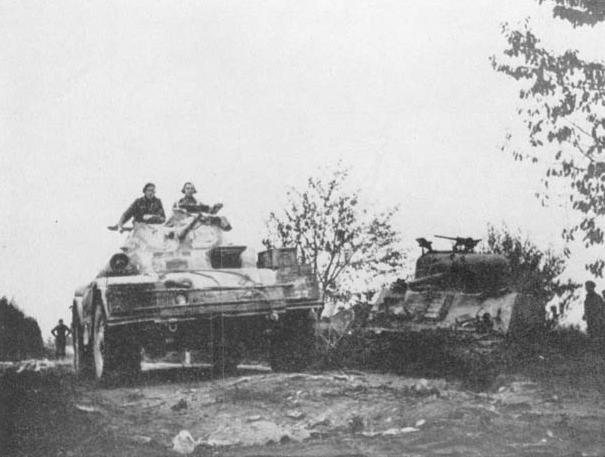
Staghounds of the regiment passing through San Giorgio de Cesena, 21 October 1944

Div Cav withdrew to Cesolo near San Severino, 60 mi (97 km) in the rear. The regiment was converted to a standard infantry battalion, since its light armoured vehicles were considered unsuited to Italian terrain and the division was short of infantry. The battalion retained the title of Squadron for its company-size units, spent a month retraining as infantry and left Cesolo on 24 November. Around this time D Squadron was formed under command of Major S.W. Askew. The New Zealand Division was placed under the command of V Corps for the crossing of the Lamone river and the capture of Faenza. The battalion became part of the 6th New Zealand Infantry Brigade, operating in the sector facing the Lamone opposite Faenza and the brigade's small front was held by the 26th Battalion. The 24th and 25th Battalions were scheduled to replace the 26th next, with Div Cav replacing them. The battalion camped in Forlì before taking over its positions on 2 December. The division mounted a simulated attack to support the British 46th Division crossing of the Lamone with an artillery barrage and tank fire. After the 5th New Zealand Infantry Brigade moved south to take over the 46th Division positions, the 6th New Zealand Infantry Brigade moved west to take over the 5th New Zealand Infantry Brigade sector and the regiment was now opposite Faenza. A and B Squadrons moved to the rear, after being relieved by the British 4th Reconnaissance Regiment and C Squadron laid smoke to cover the 13 December crossing of the Lamone by 4th Brigade tanks. The attack on Faenza began the next day and the Maori and 23rd Battalions were at their objectives by 15 December but Axis holdouts continued to resist in the town. The regiment entered Faenza in the afternoon and camped there until 27 December, when it replaced 26th Battalion on the Senio. During the night of 1/2 January 1945, the Maori Battalion relieved the battalion, which moved to Forlì. Div Cav returned to the front after a week and took up the positions of the 25th Battalion, which it fortified against a possible German counter-attack. Alexander decided to wait for early spring to advance to the Po and the battalion settled into static positional warfare. The battalion was relieved by the 25th Battalion on 21 January and returned to Forlì.

=== Spring 1945 offensive in Italy ===
During the final Allied offensive in Italy, the battalion was assigned to the new 9th New Zealand Infantry Brigade, which was allocated as the divisional reserve in April for Operation Buckland. Initially, the battalion protected the engineers bridging the Senio. When the bridges were finished, it covered the open flank around Barbiano resulting from a delay to the 3rd Carpathian Division. The battalion then attacked Massa Lombarda in preparation for a crossing of the Sillaro river, boarding Kangaroo APCs and moving forward. Tiger tanks forced the battalion to dismount and dig in before the Tigers were knocked out by Allied artillery. A and C Squadrons supported the 22nd Battalion in attacking Squazzaloca. The battalion reached the Sillaro River, crossed it at first light and was relieved by the 27th Battalion on 15 April. D Squadron cleared Sesto Imolese of Axis troops, with A and B Squadrons protecting the left flank. On 16–17 April, the battalion protected the right flank behind the 22nd Battalion. The attack across the Gaiana began with a massive artillery barrage during the night of 18 April. Although the battalion crossed the river unopposed, it was counter-attacked beyond the barrage area. Advancing against stiff Axis resistance, A and C Squadrons were on the far side of the Quaderna Canal by 01:30 on 19 April. The battalion dug in there, resisting Axis counter-attacks; eleven men from the battalion were killed and 47 wounded.

Relieved by the 23rd Battalion, Div Cav was moved back to Medicina. After two days of rest there, the 9th Infantry Brigade returned to the front lines behind the Allied advance towards the Po river. The battalion was 7 mi (11 km) north of Bologna by the first night back, when it was bombed by an Axis aircraft which wounded four men. Next day the battalion was on the banks of the Reno river and crossed the Po after the rest of the brigade on 26 April. After its advance was stopped by the Fratta Canal, the battalion moved east to Ospedaletto. A and C Squadrons cleared Ospedaletto of the Axis rearguard, taking fifty prisoners. The battalion bypassed scattered German units, racing for Padua during the night. It reached Padua around midnight and was greeted by jubilant Italian crowds. On 29 April a shell struck battalion headquarters, wounding Lieutenant Colonel Wilder and killing two men (the last men of Div Cav killed in action during the war). Wilder was replaced by Lieutenant Colonel Victor Tanner; the battalion advanced again at midday on Route 11 towards Venice, encountering its last strong German resistance in Mira. No. 12 Troop flanked the German positions, capturing 140 men and killing about 20. The battalion raced on, changing to Route 14 headed for Trieste, and was ferried over the Piave on 30 April; it was at Monfalcone, controlled by Yugoslav partisans, by the end of 1 May. Trieste was reached the next day and the battalion camped just beyond the city. Div Cav was relieved on 6 May by a battalion of the 363rd Infantry Regiment of the US 91st Division, and moved to Barcola.

== Japan ==
After the Japanese surrender on 15 August 1945, the New Zealand government agreed to contribute units to a joint British Commonwealth Occupation Force (BCOF). The 9th New Zealand Infantry Brigade – including Div Cav, which regained its identity as a regiment – became part of the NZ contingent, known as J Force. In October, D Squadron was changed into an all-Maori unit, replacing men sent back to New Zealand. The regiment embarked for Kure on 21 February 1946, reaching its destination on 19 March and relieving the 67th Australian Battalion on Eta-Jima on 23 March; it was billeted in Naval Academy Etajima. After patrolling the island, the regiment was replaced by the Royal Welch Fusiliers and moved to Hirao. By May its permanent headquarters was at the Mizuba naval barracks. Lieutenant Colonel John Worsnop took command on 28 June 1946 and the regimental flag was lowered for the last time on 5 August 1947; the regiment was disbanded on 1 September 1947.

== Casualties, decorations and battle honours ==
During the war, the regiment suffered a total of 686 casualties, including 134 killed, 430 wounded, and 111 captured. Five officers received the Distinguished Service Order. The following awards (in some cases, multiple times) were also bestowed: 12 Military Crosses, 5 Distinguished Conduct Medals, 24 Military Medals, and one British Empire Medal. Three soldiers were appointed Members of the Order of the British Empire. One officer also received the Silver Cross of the Greek Order of the Phoenix. Several of these awards were bestowed to Div Cav personnel for actions while attached to the Long Range Desert Group.

In 1957, the New Zealand Scottish Regiment, which inherited the Divisional Cavalry's lineage, was awarded the following battle honours for the service of the Divisional Cavalry Regiment:

- Mount Olympus, Aliakmon Bridge, Tempe Gorge, Elasson, Greece 1941, Crete, Galatas, Canea, 42nd Street, Withdrawal to Sphakia, Middle East 1941–1944, Tobruk 1941, Sidi Azeiz, Zemla, Bardia 1942, Defence of the Alamein Line, Ruweisat Ridge, El Mreir, Alam el Halfa, El Alamein, El Agheila, Nofilia, Advance to Tripoli, Medinine, Tebaga Gap, Point 201 (Roman Wall), El Hamma, Enfidaville, Djebibine, North Africa 1940–43, The Sangro, Castel Frentano, Orsogna, Cassino I, Advance to Florence, Cerbaia, San Michele, Paula Line, Sant Angelo in Salute, Pisciatello, Bologna, Sillaro Crossing, Italy 1943–45.

== Commanders ==
The following officers commanded the Divisional Cavalry Regiment:

- Lieutenant Colonel Caro James Pierce (29 September 1939 – 22 February 1941)
- Lieutenant Colonel Hugh Graeme Carruth (22 February – 26 July 1941)
- Lieutenant Colonel Arthur J. Nicoll (26 July 1941 – 5 October 1942)
- Lieutenant Colonel James Henderson Sutherland (5 October 1942 – 28 January 1943)
- Lieutenant Colonel Ian Bonifant (28 January 1943 – 18 April 1944)
- Lieutenant Colonel Nicholas Perry Wilder (18 April 1944 – 6 January 1945)
- Lieutenant Colonel James Rutherford Williams (6 January – 29 April 1945)
- Lieutenant Colonel Victor Joseph Tanner (29 April – 7 August 1945)
- Lieutenant Colonel Duncan MacIntyre (7 August 1945 – 28 June 1946)
- Lieutenant Colonel John Albert Worsnop (28 June 1946 – 3 May 1947)
- Lieutenant Colonel Ralph Bonner McQueen (3 May – 1 September 1947)
