= Castle of Carpineto Sinello =

Castle in Carpineto Sinello, Italy

Coordinates: 42.0102°N 14.5033°E

Ducal Castle of Carpineto Sinello
- Castello ducale di Carpineto Sinello
- Carpineto Sinello
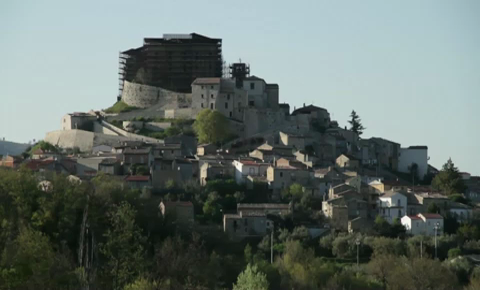
- Castle in Carpineto Sinello

Site information
- Type: Castle

Location

Site history
- Built: 14th century

The Ducal Castle of Carpineto Sinello (Italian: Castello ducale di Carpineto Sinello) is a Renaissance castle in Carpineto Sinello, province of Chieti, Abruzzo, southern Italy.

== History ==
The original structure dates back to the 14th century with subsequent transformations in the 16th and 18th centuries. The fortress, initially the residence of feudal lords, gradually took on the form of a fortified palace until Michele Bassi made modifications to suit his needs. The building was constructed around a pre-existing medieval tower with a quadrangular base.

== Architecture ==
The castle is located on Via Salita Castello at the top of a hill. The structure consists of various interconnected buildings, including the tower with sloping walls, the residential palace, and a courtyard. The materials used are limestone and sandstone. Inside the residential palace, there are murals and stucco decorations on the cornice facing the courtyard. The southern side is separated from the upper area by a redundone. The south side retains a gun port and some stucco decorations in the form of cherubs. Access to the courtyard is via a ramp, which leads to rooms that were once used as stables, and through a gateway, one reaches the actual courtyard.
