= 14th Light Anti-Aircraft Regiment (New Zealand) =

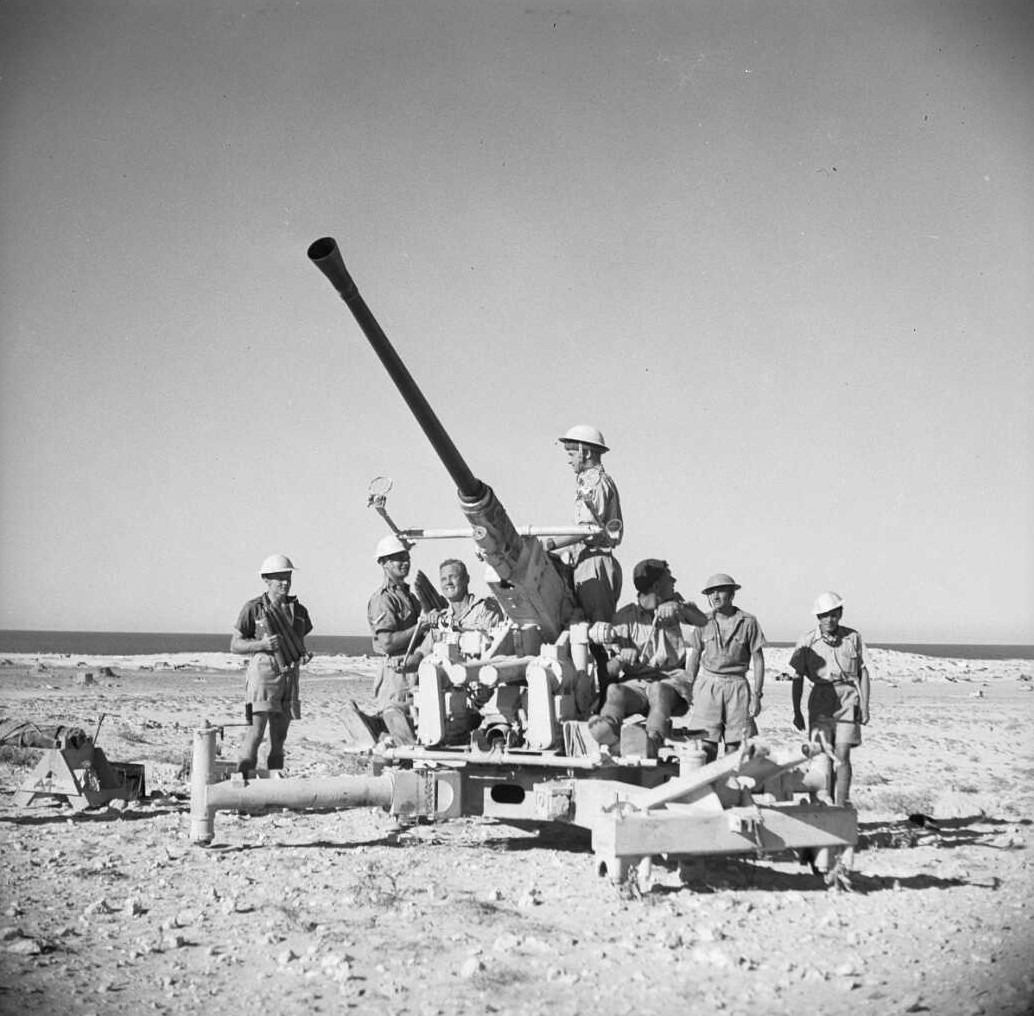
- Active: 1940–1944
- Country: New Zealand
- Branch: New Zealand Military Forces
- Type: Air Defence
- Size: 910 Personnel
- Part of: 2nd New Zealand Division
- Engagements: Second World War

Insignia
- Distinguishing Patch

The 14th Light Anti-Aircraft Regiment was an air defence regiment of the New Zealand Military Forces raised during the Second World War. It saw service as part of the 2nd New Zealand Division during the North African, Tunisian and Italian campaigns, before being disbanded in October 1944.

== History ==
=== Formation ===
14th Light Anti-Aircraft Regiment was formed at Papakura Camp on 7 January 1940. No anti-aircraft guns were available in New Zealand at that time and the regiment was forced to train without any anit-aircraft equipment. In May 1941 the regiment arrived in Egypt and joined the New Zealand Division which had just been evacuated from Crete. Only in June did the regiment receive its first 40 mm Bofors anti-aircraft guns. The regiment was organised into a headquarters battery and three gun batteries: 41, 42 and 43 batteries. Each battery had 12 Bofors guns, for a total of 36 guns, and was further subdivided into three troops. (Note: The troops were lettered sequentially, i.e. 41 Battery (A, B, C troops), 42 Battery (D, E, F troops), 43 Battery (G, H, J troops))

=== Disbandment ===
Owing to the allied air superiority in Italy, and a shortage of infantry in the New Zealand Division, 14th Light Anti-Aircraft Regiment was disbanded on 24 October 1944. Some of the men were transferred to other artillery units, while 157 others went to the Divisional Cavalry Regiment (which was being restructured as an infantry battalion). The final score for 14th Light Anti-Aircraft Regiment was 67.5 (Note: Fractions of an aircraft kill could be awarded if multiple regiments contributed to shooting down an aircraft) aircraft shot down, as well as one naval craft, one tank and an unknown number of vehicles destroyed. The regiment had lost a total of 66 men killed in action or died of wounds.

== Notes ==
Footnotes

Citations
