= 6th Field Regiment (New Zealand) =

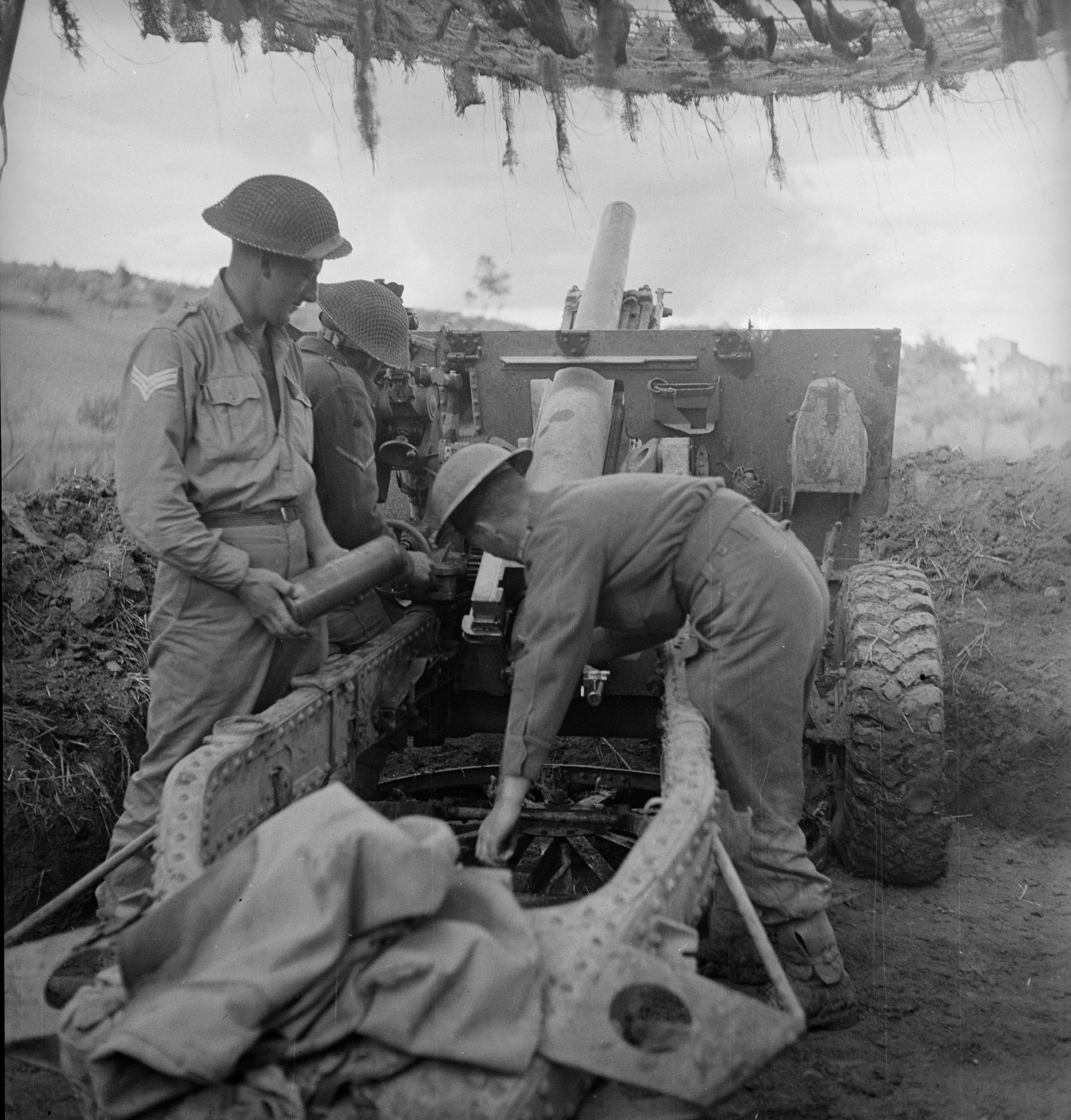
- Active: 1940–1946
- Country: New Zealand
- Branch: New Zealand Military Forces
- Type: Artillery
- Size: Regiment
- Part of: 2nd New Zealand Division
- Engagements: Second World War

Insignia
- Distinguishing Patch

The 6th Field Regiment was an artillery regiment of the New Zealand Military Forces raised during the Second World War. It saw service as part of the 2nd New Zealand Division during the Greek, North African, Tunisian and Italian campaigns, before being disbanded in January 1946.
