= 2nd New Zealand Division =

WW2 New Zealand Army formation

New Zealand Division 2nd New Zealand Division
- Divisional insignia of the 2nd New Zealand Division
- Active: 1939–45
- Disbanded: c.1945
- Country: New Zealand
- Branch: New Zealand Military Forces
- Type: Infantry
- Size: Division
- Part of: British Eighth Army
- Garrison/HQ: Maadi Camp, Egypt (1940–c.1943)
- Engagements: North African Campaign, Italy 1943–45

Commanders
- Notable commanders: Bernard C. Freyberg; Lindsay Inglis (temporary); Howard Kippenberger (temporary); Graham Parkinson (temporary); Stephen Weir (temporary)

The 2nd New Zealand Division, initially the New Zealand Division, was an infantry division of the New Zealand Military Forces (New Zealand's army) during the Second World War. The division was commanded for most of its existence by Lieutenant-General Bernard C. Freyberg. It fought in Greece, Crete, the Western Desert and Italy. In the Western Desert Campaign, the division played a prominent role in the defeat of German and Italian forces in the Second Battle of El Alamein and the British Eighth Army's advance to Tunisia.

In late 1943, the division was moved to Italy, taking part in the Eighth Army's campaign on Italy's Adriatic coast, which ground to a halt at the end of the year. In early 1944, the division formed the nucleus of the New Zealand Corps, fighting two battles attempting unsuccessfully to penetrate the Gustav Line at Monte Cassino. The division saw further action on the Gothic Line in 1944 and took part in the Allied 1945 Spring offensive, which led to the surrender of German forces in Italy in May. After returning to New Zealand, reorganised elements of the division formed part of the occupational forces in Japan from 1945.

== History ==
=== Formation ===
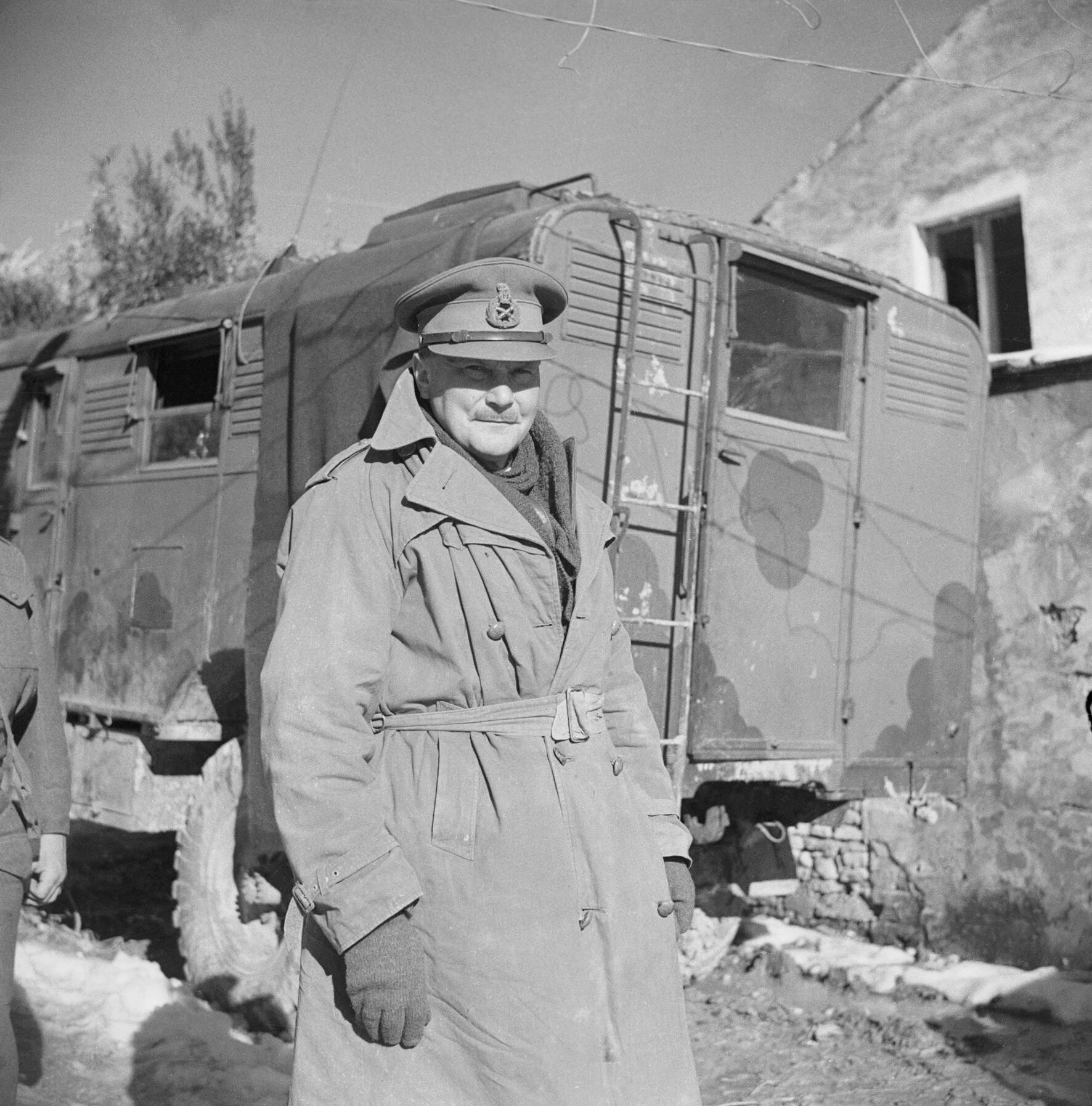
Bernard Freyberg (pictured) would command the 2nd New Zealand Division for most of its existence

At the outbreak of the Second World War in September 1939, it was decided that New Zealand should provide an Expeditionary Force. Initially a 'Special Force' was to be raised, of one battalion in each of the three military districts, but the requirement was then raised, to that of a division. Major-General Bernard C. Freyberg, of the British Army, but with strong New Zealand connections, was appointed as General Officer Commanding. This force became known as 2nd New Zealand Expeditionary Force (2NZEF) and the division, initially, as the New Zealand Division. The first echelon, 2NZEF Headquarters and the 4th Infantry Brigade, left New Zealand in January and landed in Egypt on 12 February 1940. The second echelon, the 5th Infantry Brigade, was diverted to Britain on Italy's entry into the war, joining the British VII Corps. Composite elements were formed into an extra brigade, 7th Brigade, to strengthen the invasion defences. The third echelon, the 6th Infantry Brigade, arrived in Egypt on 27 October 1940 and concentration of the division was completed after the second echelon, no longer required in Britain, reached Egypt the following March.

The division remained as part of the British Eighth Army to the end of World War II in 1945, during which it fought in the Battle of Greece (March–April 1941), the Battle of Crete (May 1941), Operation Crusader (November–December 1941), Minqar Qaim (June 1942), First Battle of El Alamein (July 1942), Second Battle of El Alamein (October–November 1942), Libya and Tunisia (December 1942 – May 1943), the Sangro (October–December 1943), Battle of Monte Cassino (February–March 1944), Central Italy (May–December 1944), and the Adriatic Coast (April–May 1945).

=== Defence of Greece ===
In March 1941, the division was deployed to Greece to assist British and Australian forces in defending the country from an expected German invasion. The New Zealanders were combined with Australian and British forces as 'W Force' under Lieutenant-General Sir Henry Maitland Wilson. The immediate operational commander was Australian Lieutenant-General Thomas Blamey with his I Australian Corps headquarters, which was briefly renamed Anzac Corps. On 6 April, the Germans launched their invasion, commencing the Battle of Greece. They overwhelmed the British and Commonwealth forces and forcing them to retreat to Crete and Egypt by 6 April. The last New Zealand troops had evacuated mainland Greece by 25 April, having sustained losses of 291 men killed, 387 seriously wounded, and 1,826 men captured in this campaign.

=== Battle of Crete ===
Since most 2nd New Zealand Division troops had evacuated to Crete from mainland Greece, they were very much involved in the defence of Crete against further German attacks. As Freyberg was judged to have performed extremely well during the evacuation of Greece, he was given command of all Allied forces for the defence of the island. Consequently, the New Zealand Division temporarily lost him as its commander. However, the attempt to defend Crete was as doomed as that to defend Greece had been.

German paratroopers landed in May 1941. While suffering many casualties, the Germans gradually gained the upper hand over the Allied forces in the Battle of Crete. By the end of the month, German soldiers had once again overwhelmed British and Commonwealth forces, and it was decided to evacuate the division from the island, again without its heavy weapons. This evacuation was to Egypt, with the forces landing in Alexandria in June. The unit's ability to help itself to enemy—and Allied—heavy weapons and transport led to it being nicknamed "Freyberg's Forty Thousand Thieves". In the Battle for Crete, 671 New Zealanders were killed, 967 wounded and 2,180 captured. During the battle, Charles Upham was awarded the first of his two Victoria Crosses.

=== North Africa ===
==== Operation Crusader ====
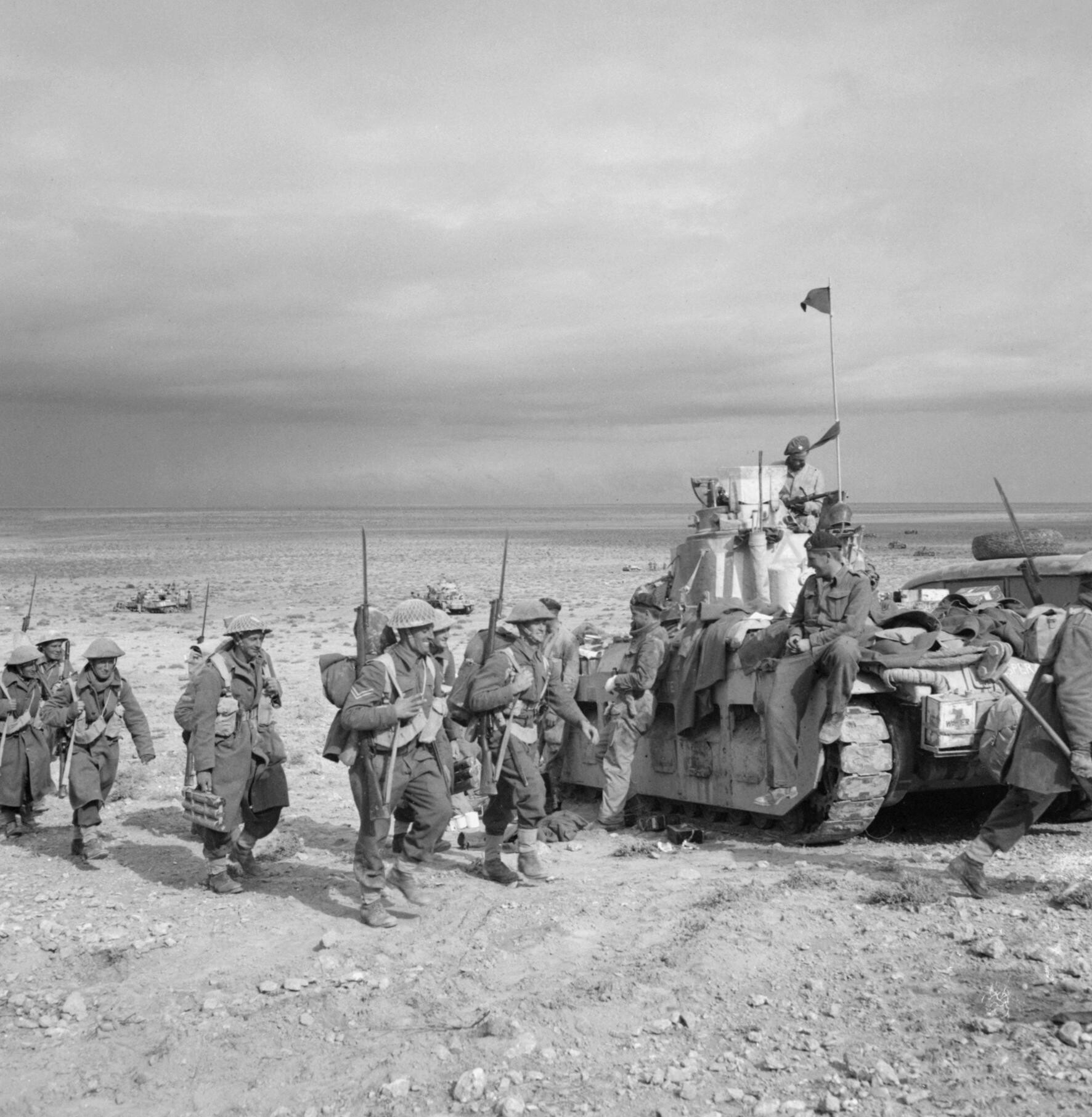
New Zealand Infantry linking up with the Tobruk garrison

Following the disasters in Europe, the division was then integrated into the regular order of battle of the British Eighth Army. It fought in many of the critical battles in the North African Campaign over the next year and a half. On 18 November 1941, the division took part in Operation Crusader. The New Zealand troops crossed the Libyan frontier into Cyrenaica, and linked up with the British 70th Infantry Division of the Tobruk Garrison on 26 November. Operation Crusader was an overall success for the British and the New Zealand troops withdrew to Syria to recover. The campaign in Libya was the most costly that the division fought during the Second World War, with 879 men killed, and 1,700 wounded.

Originally known as the 'New Zealand Division', the division became known as 2nd New Zealand Division from June 1942 onward as part of the Operation Cascade deception scheme and the 'formation' of Maadi Camp, the division's base area in Egypt, as "6th NZ Division".

==== Mersa Matruh ====
After the Eighth Army's defeat in the Gazala battles, fresh forces were brought up to check the Axis forces in their drive into Egypt. The division was transported from Syria to Mersa Matruh. In the ensuing battle, the division's retreat was cut off on 27 June when the 21st Panzer Division got to the east of the division. That night, the division's 4th Brigade broke through the German positions, and the division retired to El Alamein.

==== El Alamein ====
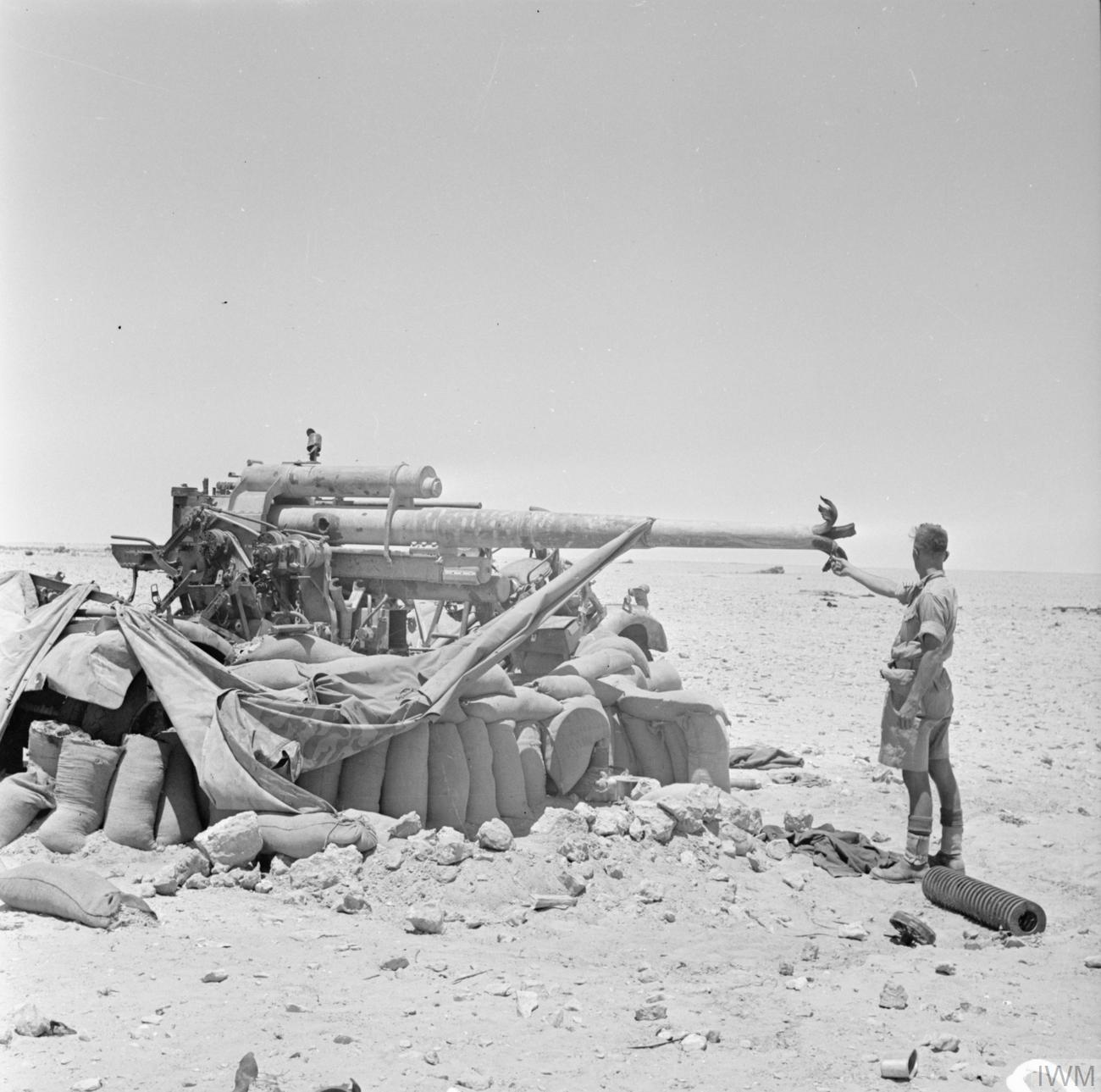
New Zealand Soldier with a captured German 88mm anti-tank gun near El Alamein

The division played a prominent role in both Battles of El Alamein. During the First Battle of El Alamein, in July 1942, the division put in a night attack against the Afrika Korps, commanded by Erwin Rommel. As no armoured support was available to the division after their night attack against the Germans at Ruweisat Ridge, the 4th New Zealand Brigade was shattered, with the loss of around 3,000 men, during the fighting that resulted when German Panzers counter-attacked the New Zealand infantry the following morning. It was for his actions in this battle that Charles Upham was awarded the Bar to his VC, becoming only the third man to be awarded the VC twice and the first soldier in a combatant role. (Note: The other two recipients of the VC and Bar are Arthur Martin-Leake and Noel Chavasse, both doctors in the Royal Army Medical Corps.) Also at Ruweisat, Sergeant Keith Elliott of 22nd Battalion was awarded the VC for continuing to lead his company, despite wounds, in assaults which led to the destruction of five machine guns plus an anti-tank gun and the capture of 130 prisoners.

During the Second Battle of El Alamein, the division broke through the German positions and got behind Rommel's flank. During the night of 1–2 November 1942, the British 9th Armoured Brigade was to have advanced in support of an attack by the division. However, it was stopped in the minefield lanes by the 15th Panzer and 90th Light Divisions; the following morning, the armour continued to be attacked, suffering heavy losses. However, the 9th Armoured Brigade's sacrifice had made the follow-up successes possible.

==== Tunisia ====
Following the victory at Alamein, the Eighth Army advanced west through Libya to El Agheila. For much of this time, Lieutenant general Bernard Montgomery, the Eighth Army commander since August 1942, was obliged to maintain a relatively small forward force because of the difficulties caused by a very extended supply line and the division was therefore held in reserve at Bardia. At the Battle of El Agheila, the division was brought forward with supporting tanks to conduct an outflanking movement while two divisions made a frontal attack. The battle started on the night of 11 December. Looking to preserve his forces, Rommel commenced a withdrawal to Buerat on the 12th.

The division then formed the left flank of the advancing Eighth Army and on 16 December had an opportunity to trap the retreating Axis forces. However, the division's troops were strung out and without anti-tank guns. The 15th Panzer Division was therefore able to punch through and secure the line of retreat.

A further unsuccessful attempt to get to the rear of the withdrawing Axis forces took place at Nofaliya. The division then remained in reserve in the Nofaliya area until early January, when it was ordered forward to take part in the final push through Buerat and advance the remaining 200 miles (320 km) to Tripoli. The operation began on 15 January; by 21 January, Tripoli was less than 50 miles (80 km) ahead. However, skilful delaying tactics allowed the Axis forces to withdraw in good order and when leading elements of Eighth Army entered Tripoli in the early morning of 23 January its defenders had left.

The Eighth Army arrived on the Mareth defensive line on the border with Tunisia shortly after the fall of Tripoli. After an unsuccessful attempt to break through the Axis defenses at Mareth, the division was reinforced to form a New Zealand Corps to execute a left hook around the main Axis defenses through the Tebaga Gap. The attack was launched on 21 March and the entrance to the gap had been secured after four days fighting, but no breakthrough was made. Further reinforcements from British X Corps were sent to the Tebaga Gap and overall control of the operation transferred to X Corps commander Brian Horrocks. Operation Supercharge II was launched on 26 March and by 28 March the main Axis forces on the Mareth Line had been forced to withdraw by the flanking threat from the advancing British 1st Armoured and New Zealand Corps.

At the end of Supercharge II, the New Zealand Corps was broken up and its elements allocated between X and XXX Corps. On 30 March, Montgomery sent the following message to Freyberg:

My very best congratulations to NZ Corps and 10 Corps on splendid results achieved by the left hook. These results have led to the complete disintegration of the enemy resistance and the whole Mareth position. Give my congratulations to all your officers and men, and tell them how pleased I am with all they have done.

The division continued to fight in Tunisia with Eighth Army until Tunis fell to First Army on 7 May, prompting the surrender of the remaining Axis forces.

During 1943, the division was involved in what was called the Furlough Mutiny. This was "an affair that has received little attention in the literature of the Second World War" but which according to the military historian Jonathan Fennell had significant military and political implications for New Zealand's subsequent wartime role. Fennell asserts that the aftermath of the 'mutiny' meant that "the New Zealand soldier, to all intents and purposes, was able to negotiate the terms of his service in the second half of the war. As a result, 2nd New Zealand Division would fight some of its hardest battles without its most experienced veterans."

=== Italian Campaign ===
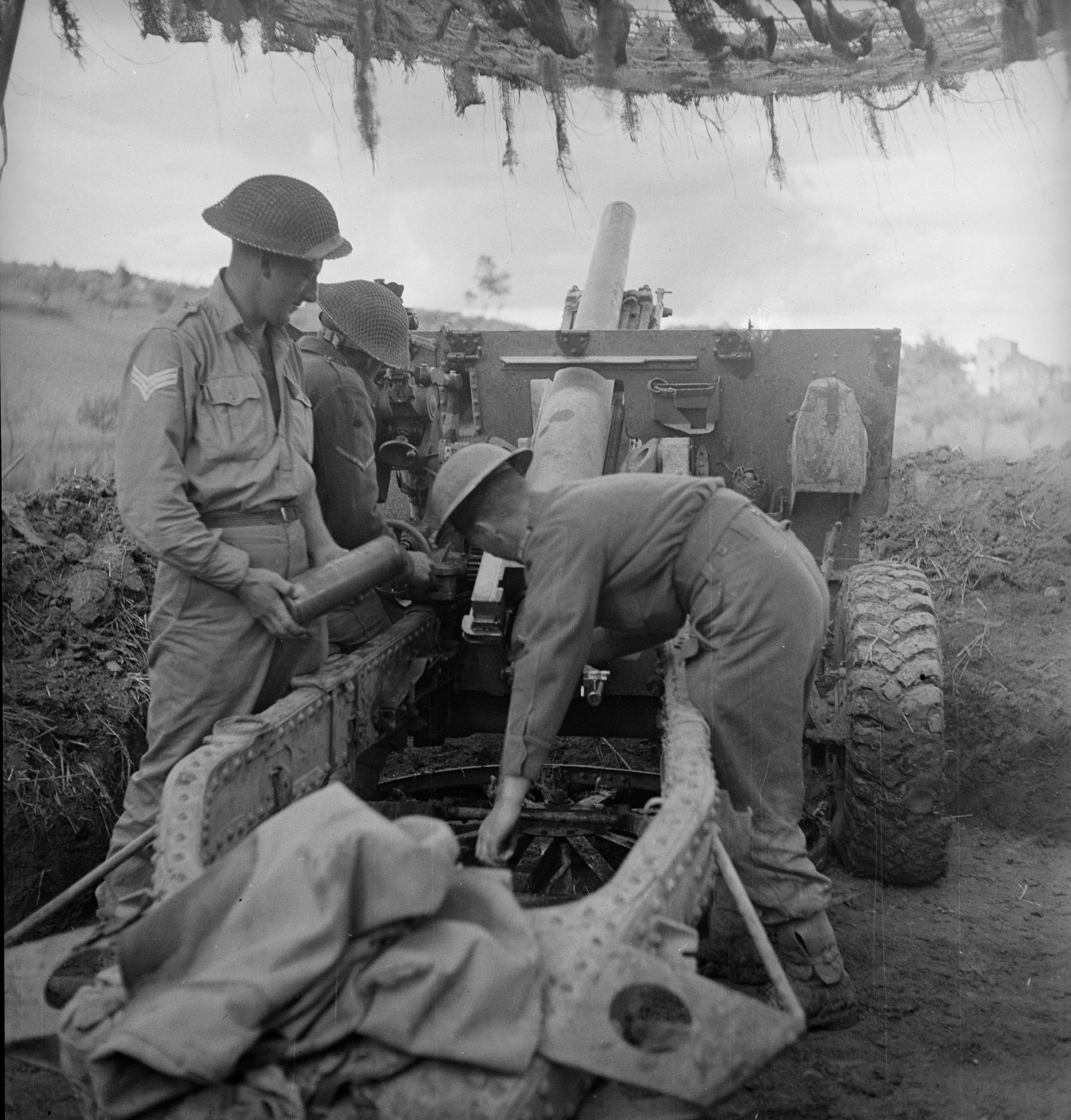
New Zealand Gunners of 6th Field Regiment in action at the Sangro River

Following the Axis surrender in Tunisia the division was withdrawn to refit and therefore took no part in the Allied invasion of Sicily. The refit included the conversion of the 4th Infantry Brigade into the 4th Armoured Brigade. The division returned to battle in the Italian Campaign in late 1943, rejoining the Eighth Army. The division came into the front line in November and took part in the advance across the Sangro at the end of the month. During December the division was involved in very heavy fighting during the Moro River Campaign at Orsogna. By the end of the year the deteriorating winter weather made movement of even tracked vehicles impossible except on metaled roads and severely impeded vital close air support operations. This, together with the failure to capture Orsogna led the Allies to call off the Adriatic coast offensive until spring brought better conditions in the skies and under foot.

In response to complaints from the troops, the New Zealand government extended a three month furlough to those in the Mediterranean who had been in service longest with the result that about 6,000 of the most experienced troops of the 2nd New Zealand Expeditionary Force returned to New Zealand including about a third of the division. The mood of those was not improved by the break from Italy. They found a large number of fighting-fit men were exempt from conscription due to being classed as in essential occupations. Wages had also risen in response to the lack of labour in the market so the differential from a soldiers pay was even higher. In the resulting "Furlough Mutiny" many refused to return to Italy; between exemptions granted and desertions about 13% of those furloughed returned, leaving the division depleted of experienced troops. Although news of the mutiny was suppressed, the soldiers remaining in Italy were well aware of the situation, leading to a drop in morale.

==== Monte Cassino ====
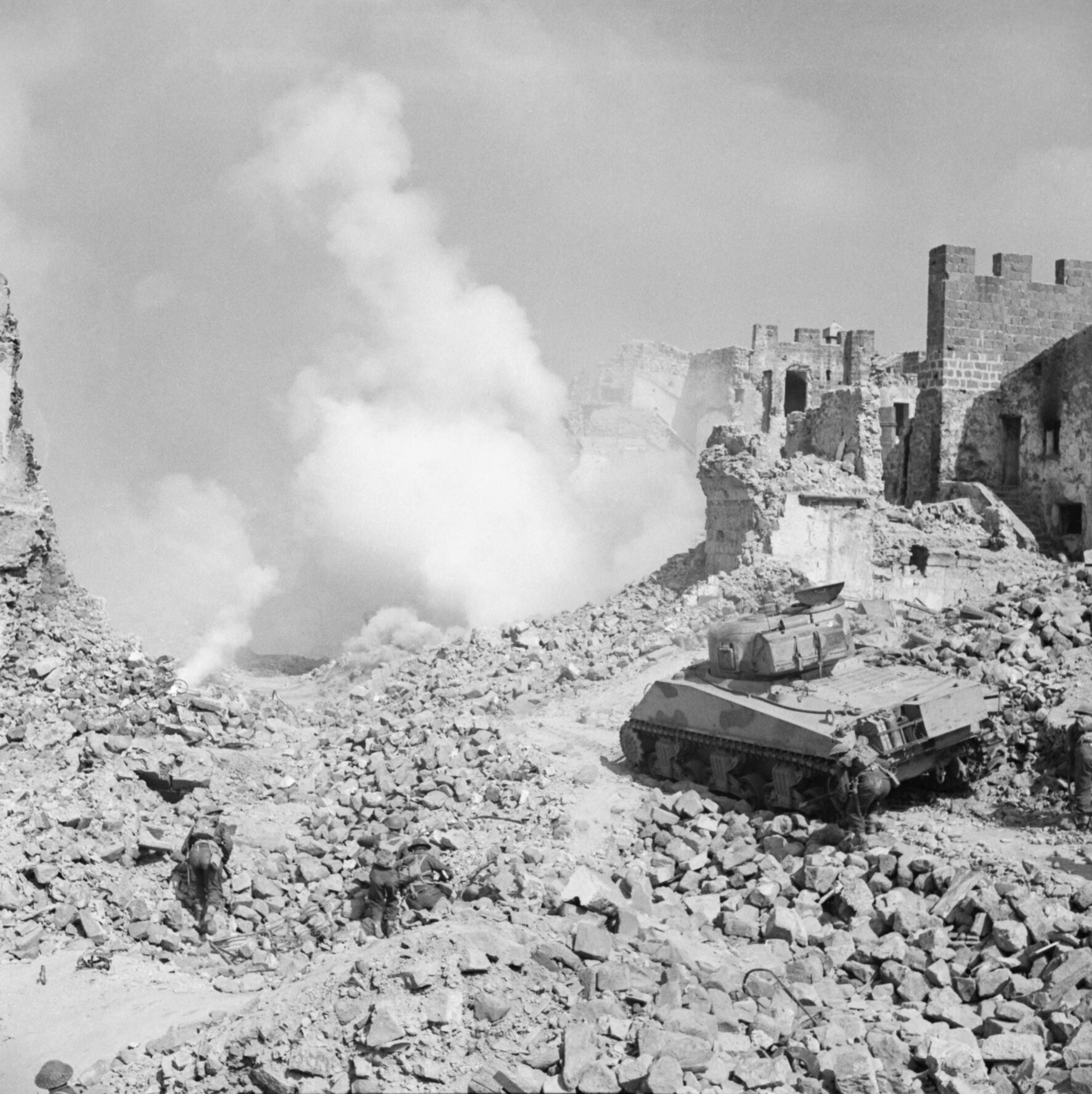
Sherman tank of the 19th Armoured Regiment at Monte Cassino

Meanwhile, to the west of the Eighth Army on the other side of the Apennine Mountains, Italy's central mountain spine, the US Fifth Army had also been fighting its way north. By the end of January 1944, the Fifth Army's attacks against the Cassino massif had ground to a halt and the "Battle for Rome" had stalled. The 15th Army Group commander General Sir Harold Alexander and Fifth Army commander Lieutenant General Mark W. Clark looked around for solutions to penetrate the defences, as their careers and reputations were irrevocably linked with success on this front, particularly due to Winston Churchill's insistence at this time, that Italy was the key to the ultimate success in the war. As part of the solution, Alexander withdrew the division from the Eighth Army line to establish a small Army Group Reserve with a view to reinforcing the Fifth Army front. Clark was initially apprehensive of making use of an ex-British Eighth Army division. As an American, he was even more apprehensive of having Freyberg, whom he considered a "prima donna" who "had to be handled with kid gloves" leading the Army Reserve. Clark feared that, due to Freyberg's extensive experience, he would question or dispute his orders. What concerned him most was that he feared that Alexander might decide to use the New Zealand Corps to replace Major general Geoffrey Keyes' US II Corps and "snatch the victory which the Americans had so dearly bought". The failure of the New Zealand Corps to capture Cassino reduced these fears and eventually made Clark more amenable towards the New Zealand Corps. Alexander also withdrew the 4th Indian Infantry Division as well as the British 78th Infantry Division from Eighth Army to join this strategic reserve. This formation was initially known as "Spadger Force" to confuse German intelligence, with the commander, Freyberg being known as "Spadger". The Corps later became known as the New Zealand Corps under command of the U.S. Fifth Army. The New Zealand Corps was not, however, a truly of corps size, since it lacked a full staff and set of corps troops. It was more a temporary extension of the division - New Zealand simply did not have the resources to fully man a corps level formation.

==== Second Battle for Cassino ====
On 8 February, Clark conceded to Alexander that US II Corps would not succeed with any further attacks and he "allowed" the British (and Dominions) to attempt to strike the final blow against the Axis line at Cassino. By this time, US VI Corps had already landed at Anzio and were under heavy threat from the reinforcing Germans. An outright destruction of the Anzio beachhead was a possibility, given the relentless enemy air, artillery, and ground assaults against VI Corps. Alexander advised Freyberg to ready the NZ Corps to take over from US II Corps, also advising him that enemy reinforcements had arrived and that even greater resistance could be expected.

Freyberg's plan initially included a wide flanking attack—differentiating it from the approach previously used by Keyes' II Corps. This flanking movement was eventually excluded from the final plan and Freyberg dictated that the attack be along the same unsuccessful lines as used by the Americans the month before. (Note: Although not explicitly recorded, it is assumed that Freyberg, new to mountain warfare, overestimated the risks associated with an advance to attack over mountainous terrain without any well-developed roads—and decided to abandon this plan in favour of the easier, but unsuccessful approach previously used.) Major-general Francis Tuker, commander of the 4th Indian Division, voiced strong disapproval regarding the plan to Freyberg, his new Corps Commander—as his division was to lead the now, frontal assault. Tuker also expressed his concern over Freyberg's apparent obsession with reducing the monastery on Monte Cassino, arguing that (supported by General Juin, commanding the French Expeditionary Corps) they were attempting to breach the strongest and most fortified point of the Gustav Line. As part of his plan, and encouraged by the complaints from Tucker, Freyberg insisted to Clark that the monastery should be flattened by bombing in the preparatory stage of the attack. Alexander, although expressing the opinion that it would be regrettable to destroy the monastery, supported Freyberg's insistence that reducing the monastery be considered a military necessity.

Allied planes dropped 442 tons of bombs on the monastery and its immediate environs in two separate attacks on 15 February, one between 09:30 and 10:00 and the other between 10:30 and 13:30, but the infantry attack, which was to commence directly after the second bombing mission, was delayed due to differences regarding H-Hour between Freyberg and his 7th Indian Brigade. Also, the division commanders were insisting that a preliminary high-point (Point 593) was to be captured as a prelude to the main attack.

The 4th Indian Division was to attack in an arc towards the south and south west, taking Point 593 and then moving south east, up the heights towards the Abbey. The 4th Indian Division would only advance on the Abbey, once the division had attacked south and south east taking the town of Cassino. The main attack eventually commenced just after last light with the 28th (Maori) Battalion tasked to cross the Rapido River and to seize the station south of Cassino town, to establish a bridgehead for the corps' armour to move into the town and to the foot of the Cassino massif—the attack starting at 21:30. By dawn, German 10th Army artillery had stopped the 28th Battalion advance on the Rapido River bridgehead and the division were forced to use all their guns to fire smoke onto the bridge and railway station areas to mask the withdrawal of the 28th Battalion. The attack had failed, and so had the 4th Indian Division attack on Point 593.

==== Third Battle ====
On the evening of 14 March, the battalions of the NZ Corps were alerted that Operation Bradman, the bombing of Cassino, was approved for the next day. In a third attempt to penetrate the Gustav Line, the Corps was again launched against Cassino town and the monastery on top of the massif. By this time, US VI Corps, which had landed at Anzio some two months before, had still not been able to break out of its beachhead, though pressure on the beachhead had significantly decreased since the beginning of the month. This third assault on Cassino was intended to not only penetrate the Gustav Line, but to draw away the German forces to further alleviate the pressure on the VI Corps at Anzio.

The bombing started at 08:00 and continued till 12:00—dropping an equivalent of four tons per acre. By 12:30, an 890 gun artillery bombardment started, which would continue for eight hours. The 6th NZ Brigade lead the attack, assaulting Cassino town, supported by the tanks of the 19th Armoured Regiment and at the same time, the 4th Indian Division was to advance on Hangman's Hill after which they were to assault the monastery. The next morning, the 4th NZ Armoured Brigade was to take over from American tanks in the Liri Valley while the 7th Indian Infantry Brigade and small NZ tank groups were to advance up the Cavendish Road (built by Indian engineers) to clear any pockets of resistance on the Cassino slopes.

The advance into Cassino town by the 6th NZ Brigade went wrong from the start as the 19th Armoured tanks were unable to pass through the badly damaged roads, covered in rubble and bomb craters. The infantry, advancing without tanks came under severe fire from German paratroopers in the town, their fire further preventing armoured engineer bulldozers from clearing access routes for the tanks. Although the armour had been stopped, the NZ Infantry still held some parts of the town, including the strategic Castle Hill. Freyberg's orders had defined that the 4th Indian Division would only commence their advance on the Abbey, once Castle Hill had been secured, as they were to pass through the NZ lines on the hill as they progressed up the mountain. It took two hours to pass the message that the hill had been secured and as it was already dark, further delays were encountered by the Indian Division struggling to find Castle Hill. The Indian advance on Hangman's Hill only commenced after midnight, further compounded by heavy rain.

The next morning, while concentrated German artillery fire and house to house fighting pinned the division in that portion of the town which they held, the 4th Indian Division was making no progress up the mountain. The 20th Armoured Regiment which was to have supported them, considered the road too risky, as numerous hairpin bends had not been secured. German reinforcements continued to arrive, bolstering the defences in town, as well as on the Cassino massif. Attempts by the division to expand their perimeter in town continued on 16 March—XIV Panzer Corps reported in this regard "... south of the town, the enemy [the NZ Division] fought our foremost posts to a standstill by weight of fire and then occupied the station after hand-to-hand fighting ... [but] the centre of the town is still in our hands."

By the afternoon of 19 March, it was evident that no further progress would be made by the division in Cassino town—the German paratrooper line held firm, with machine gun, mortar and sniper fire and continued counter-attacks to reduce the NZ perimeter. By 20 March a company of Gurkhas overran Point 435 on Hangman's Hill, 500 yards from the monastery, but were again driven back by German fire from unassailable positions. The division re-occupied the railway station and the botanical gardens in the town and the process of attack and counterattack continued until 23 March when Alexander decided to call off the offensive. The monastery, although totally destroyed by now, remained firmly in German hands.

==== Advance to the Gothic Line ====
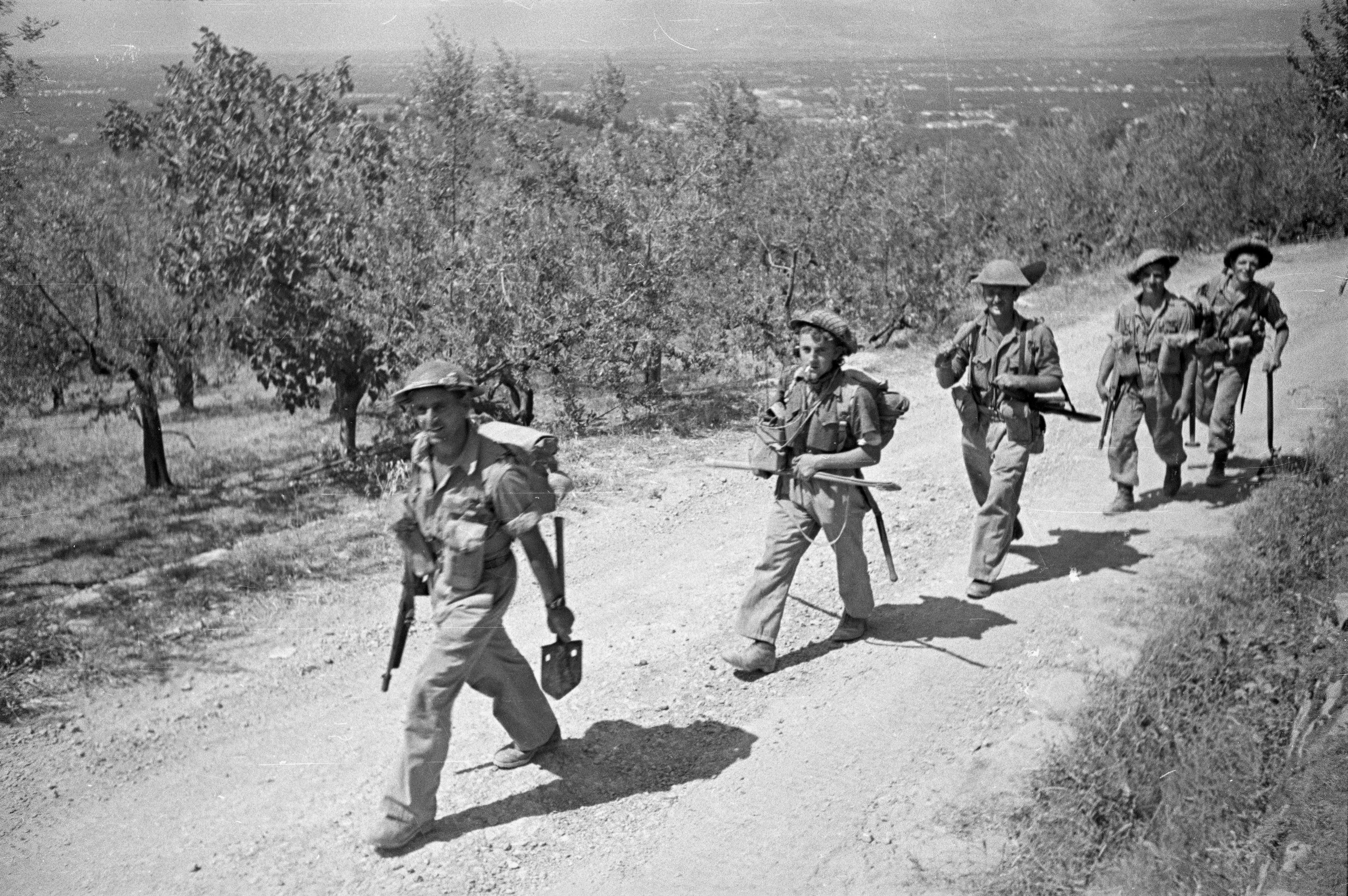
New Zealand infantry moving along the road towards Florence

Following the two assaults at Monte Cassino, the division was withdrawn and when redeployed found itself in the high Apennine sector north east of Cassino under the British Eighth Army's X Corps, commanded by Lieutenant general Richard L. McCreery. When in May 1944 the Allies launched their final and successful offensive on the Cassino front, X Corps was employed in a holding role making diversionary feints and anchoring the right flank of the Eighth Army attack. Some of the division's armoured elements were detached, however, and placed under command of the British 4th Infantry Division and 8th Indian Infantry Division to take part in XIII Corps attack in the centre of the front. When the New Zealand tanks returned from 8th Indian Division in early June, Major general Dudley Russell, the 8th Indian Division's commander wrote to Freyberg saying:

I wish you to know how glad I was to have your 18 NZ Armd Regt under my command. They fought well and nothing was too difficult for them to tackle. In fact they got across a large stretch of country which the going map said was impassable to tanks ...

As the main attack advanced, X Corps with the division moved forward to maintain protection of Eighth Army's right flank. After the fall of Rome in early June X Corps formed a pursuit force comprising the division and the 8th and 10th Indian Infantry Divisions. On 10 June elements of the division entered Avezzano and the division passed into army reserve to spend a period of rest and training.

In mid July, the division joined British XIII Corps, under Lieutenant general Sidney C. Kirkman, at the Trasimene Line as reinforcements ahead of a set piece offensive planned to carry an advance to Arezzo. The division acted as guard to the right flank of the corps. Arezzo was captured on 16 July and the advance was continued towards the River Arno and Florence. The division's capture of the eastern crests of the Pian dei Cerri hills at the start of August was the turning point of the battle for Florence. Florence was declared an open city and Allied troops entered on 4 August. Lieutenant general Oliver Leese, the Eighth Army commander wrote:

At times the enemy fought almost fanatically. They had, apparently, been ordered to hold on south of Florence at all costs. Eventually, the general advance came to a halt about 5,000 yards south of Florence and the River Arno. Owing to the necessity to take over the French front, 13th Corps was very extended. It was doubtful whether we could break into the defences until we had brought up more reserves. However, determined attacks by the New Zealand Division against the Poggio al Pino and Poggiona high ground S.E. of Florence gained the day. The New Zealand Division fought magnificently over a period of four days. If it had not been for their effort it would have been necessary to check along the whole front until we could bring in fresh divisions.

Kirkman, the Corps' commander also wrote:

Now that we have entered Florence, I should like to say how much 13 Corps owes to 2 NZ Division during its recent fighting. In the battles for Arezzo and Florence your troops as always fought magnificently, and gave us the extra punch that was necessary to eject the enemy from his chosen positions in the very difficult country south of the River Arno ...

==== Gothic Line to Trieste ====
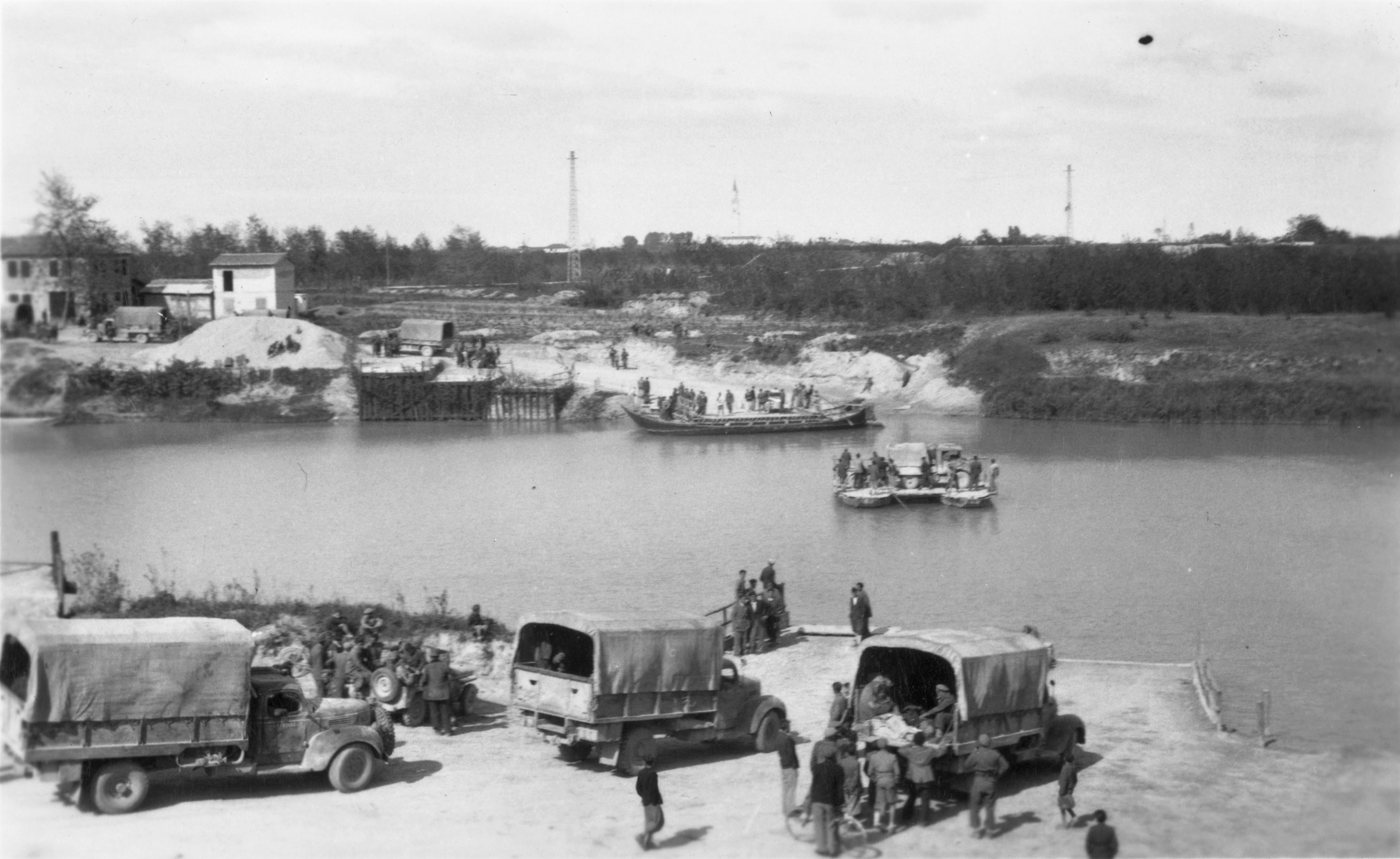
22nd Battalion crossing the Piave River, April 1945

In the autumn of 1944, the division fought as part of I Canadian Corps during Operation Olive, the offensive on the Gothic Line. In November 1944 it was then transferred to British V Corps. With one armoured and two infantry brigades, the division was well organised for mobile warfare as experienced in North Africa. In the mountainous terrain and difficult conditions underfoot found in Italy, however, tank mobility was very restricted and the division always found itself short of infantry. During the winter of 1944–45 the Divisional Cavalry Regiment and 22nd (Motor) Battalion were converted to infantry, giving each infantry brigade a fourth battalion. By the spring of 1945 the 27th Machine-Gun Battalion had also been converted to infantry and the division's infantry reorganised into three brigades each with three battalions. Manpower shortages in the division were also eased when the 3rd New Zealand Division, then fighting in the Pacific War, had been disbanded in October 1944 and 4,000 of its officers and men then transferred to the division.

In April 1945, the division, still as part of British V Corps with 8th Indian Division, was performing assault crossings of first the Senio stream and then the river Santerno between Ravenna and Bologna, marking the start of the Allied spring 1945 offensive in Italy. The division was subsequently transferred to XIII Corps and the closing days of the war saw the division race to Trieste in northern Italy to work with Josip Broz Tito's partisans, and liberate the city from German troops.

=== Aftermath ===
By the end of the war, the division had a reputation as a tough formation with good troops. This opinion had earlier been expressed by Rommel in his report to the Oberkommando der Wehrmacht on 21 July 1942 (at the end of the First Battle of El Alamein) in which he highly rated the New Zealand Division. (Note: At this time, Rommel referred to Freyberg as "an old acquaintance of mine from previous campaigns.") This view was repeated within the German 5th Panzer Division intelligence reports. Rommel also paid tribute to the division in his memoirs:

This division, with which we had already become acquainted back in 1941–1942, was among the elite of the British Army and I should have been very much happier if it had been safely tucked away in our prison camps instead of still facing us.

Montgomery, who commanded the Eighth Army, recommended that the division should be used in the invasion of Normandy but the New Zealand government did not approve the move. This was because the division was fighting at Monte Cassino at the time.

Captain Charles Upham, VC and Bar, was the only person to be awarded the Victoria Cross twice during the Second World War. Other Victoria Crosses were awarded to Jack Hinton, Alfred Hulme, Keith Elliott, and Moana-Nui-a-Kiwa Ngarimu. Lance Sergeant Haane Manahi of the Māori Battalion was posthumously honoured in 2007 by representatives of the Queen after it was decided that his Distinguished Conduct Medal, awarded for actions at Takrouna, was not to be upgraded to a VC, despite recommendations from senior officers, including Lieutenant general Brian Horrocks.

Elements of the division, the 9th Brigade, were reorganised as the division disbanded to become J Force, (Japan), the New Zealand contribution to the British Commonwealth Occupation Force in Japan.

== Order of battle ==
=== Initial composition, 1940–41 ===
Headquarters New Zealand Division

- Divisional Cavalry Regiment
- HQ Divisional Artillery
  - 4th Field Regiment
  - 5th Field Regiment
  - 6th Field Regiment
  - 7th Anti-Tank Regiment
  - 1 Survey Troop
  - 14th Light Anti-Aircraft Regiment - established at Papakura Military Camp in January 1941, arrived in Egypt with 5th Reinforcements in May 1941. Disbanded during the later stages of the Italian campaign, late 1944. The regiment served in Egypt, Palestine, Syria, Lebanon, Libya, Tunisia and Italy.
- HQ Divisional Engineers
  - 5,6,7,8 Companies
- Divisional Signals
- HQ 4 Infantry Brigade — 4th New Zealand Armoured Brigade from 1943
  - 18th Battalion
  - 19th Battalion
  - 20th Battalion
- HQ 5th Infantry Brigade
  - 21st Battalion
  - 22nd Battalion
  - 23rd Battalion
- HQ 6th Infantry Brigade
  - 24th Battalion
  - 25th Battalion
  - 26th Battalion
- 27th Machine-Gun Battalion
- 28th (Māori) Battalion
- HQ Divisional Army Service Corps
- Divisional Ammunition Company
- Divisional Petrol Company
- Divisional Supply Column
- Reserve MT Company
- 4, 5, 6 Field Ambulances
- 4 Field Hygiene Section
- Divisional Provost Company
- Divisional Intelligence Section
- Divisional Postal Unit
- Divisional Employment Platoon
- Divisional Salvage Unit
- Divisional Mobile Bath Unit
- Divisional Mobile Laundry and Decontamination Unit
- Divisional Ordnance Field Park

=== Order of Battle as at 11 May 1944 ===
Order of battle taken from the New Zealand Official History.

- HQ 2 NZ Division
  - 2 NZ Divisional Cavalry
- HQ 4 Armoured Brigade
  - 4 Squadron, 2 NZ Divisional Signals
  - 18 Armoured Regiment
  - 19 Armoured Regiment
  - 20 Armoured Regiment
  - 22 (Motor) Battalion
- HQ 2 NZ Divisional Artillery
  - 4 Field Regiment
  - 5 Field Regiment
  - 6 Field Regiment
  - 7 Anti-Tank Regiment
  - 14 Light Anti-Aircraft Regiment
  - 36 Survey Battery
- HQ 2 NZ Divisional Engineers
  - 5 Field Park Company
  - 6 Field Company
  - 7 Field Company
  - 8 Field Company
- HQ 5 Infantry Brigade
  - 5 Infantry Brigade Defence Platoon
  - 21 Battalion
  - 23 Battalion
  - 28 (Maori) Battalion
- HQ 6 Infantry Brigade
  - 6 Infantry Brigade Defence Platoon
  - 24 Battalion
  - 25 Battalion
  - 26 Battalion
- 27 (Machine Gun) Battalion
- HQ Command NZ Army Service Corps
  - 1 Ammunition Company
  - 2 Ammunition Company
  - 1 Petrol Company
  - 1 Supply Company
  - 4 Reserve Mechanical Transport Company
  - 6 Reserve Mechanical Transport Company
  - 18 Tank Transporter Company
  - Water Issue Section
  - NZ Section, Motor Ambulance Convoy
- Medical
  - 4 Field Ambulance
  - 5 Field Ambulance
  - 6 Field Ambulance
  - 4 Field Hygiene Section
  - 1 Mobile Casualty Clearing Station
  - 2 Field Transfusion Unit
  - 1 Field Surgical Unit
  - 2 Anti-Malarial Control Unit
  - 3 Anti-Malarial Control Unit
  - 102 Mobile Venereal Disease Treatment Centre
- Dental
  - 1 Mobile Dental Unit
- Ordnance
  - 2 NZ Divisional Ordnance Field Park
  - Mobile Laundry and Bath Unit
- Electrical and Mechanical Engineers
  - 2 NZ Divisional Workshops
  - 4 Armoured Brigade Workshops
  - 5 Infantry Brigade Workshop Section
  - 6 Infantry Brigade Workshop Section
  - 1 Armoured Troops Recovery Unit
- 2 NZ Divisional Provost Company
- 1 Field Cash Office
- 2 NZ Divisional Postal Unit
- Reinforcement Transit Unit

== See also ==
- Military history of New Zealand during World War II
- Official History of New Zealand in the Second World War
