= Carpineto Sinello =

- Comune
- Comune di Carpineto Sinello
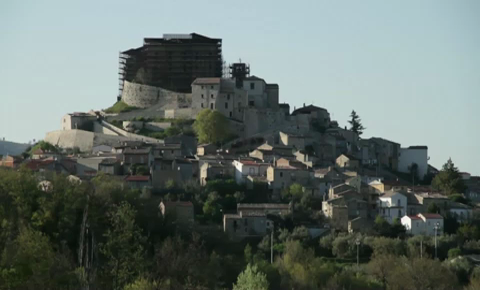

- Location within Italy Location within Abruzzo
- Coordinates: 42°1′N 14°30′E
- Country: Italy
- Region: Abruzzo
- Province: Province of Chieti (CH)
- Frazioni: Montagnola, Policorvo

Government
  - Mayor: Antonio Colonna

Area
  - Total: 29 km^{2} (11 sq mi)
- Elevation: 381 m (1,250 ft)

Population (31 March 2017)
  - Total: 592
  - Density: 20/km^{2} (53/sq mi)
- Demonym: Carpinetani
- Time zone: UTC+1 (CET)
  - Summer (DST): UTC+2 (CEST)
- Postal code: 66030
- Dialing code: 0872
- Website: Official website

Carpineto Sinello is a comune and town in the province of Chieti in the Abruzzo region of central-southern Italy.

== Main sights ==
- Ducal Castle
- Museum of Swine
- Church of San Michele Arcangelo
