= 5th Field Regiment (New Zealand) =

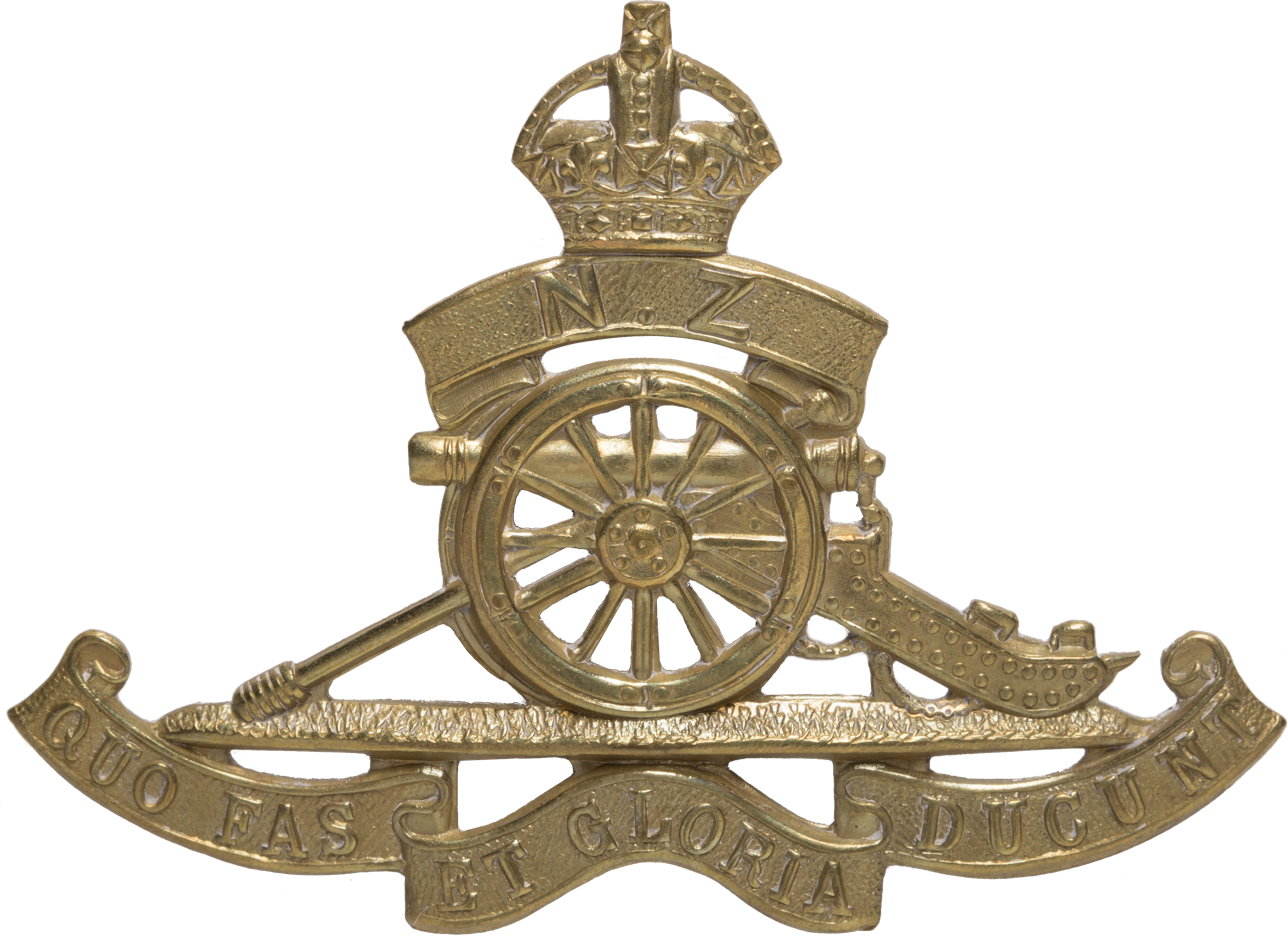
- Cap badge of the New Zealand Artillery
- Active: 1940–1946
- Country: New Zealand
- Branch: New Zealand Military Forces
- Type: Artillery
- Size: Regiment
- Part of: 2nd New Zealand Division
- Engagements: Second World War

Commanders
- Notable commanders: Raymond Queree

Insignia
- Distinguishing Patch

The 5th Field Regiment was an artillery regiment of the New Zealand Military Forces raised during the Second World War. It saw service as part of the 2nd New Zealand Division during the Greek, North African, Tunisian and Italian campaigns, before being disbanded in January 1946.
