= Tanks of New Zealand =

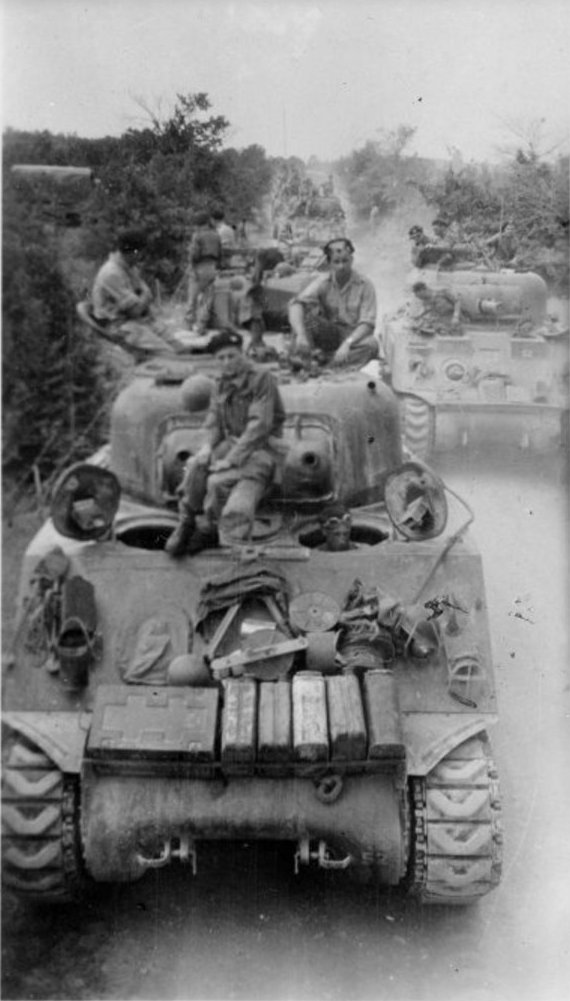
Shermans of New Zealand's 20 Armoured Regiment on the road to Trieste, May 1945

The New Zealand Army use of tanks from after the First World War, through the interwar period, the Second World War, the Cold War and to the present day has been limited, but there is some history. The New Zealand armed forces developed in the early twentieth century but served alongside the British and other Empire and Commonwealth nations in World War I and World War II.

The outbreak of the Second World War in 1939 led to an expansion of New Zealand's armoured force and the New Zealand Armoured Corps was formed in January 1942. From 1942 small numbers of American light and medium tanks were supplied to and used by the New Zealand Army, along with British tanks. Throughout this period the Army has primarily been a light infantry force, but New Zealand did design its own tanks such as the Schofield tank named after its designer, and the Bob Semple tank designed by New Zealand Minister of Works Bob Semple during World War II.

== Overview ==
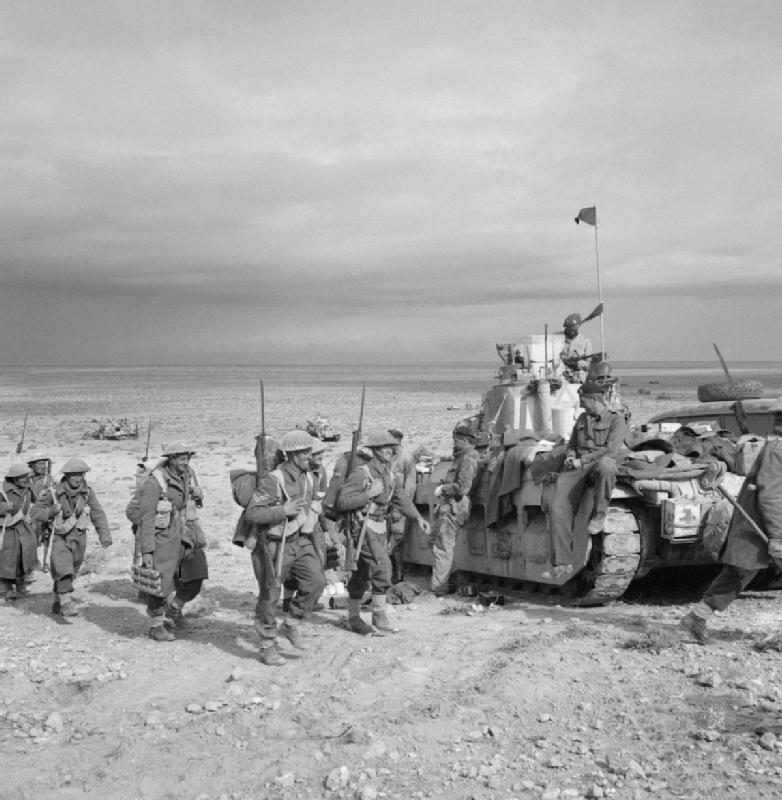
Matilda Tank along with infantry of New Zealand 19th Battalion linking up with the Tobruk garrison, 27 November 1941

Originating out of the need to build military hardware from available materials in New Zealand, the New Zealand designed Bob Semple tank was built from corrugated iron on a tractor base. Built early in the second World War, these tanks were a civilian effort to design and create a means to protect New Zealand.

Designed and built without formal plans or blueprints, it had numerous design flaws and practical difficulties, and was never put into mass production or used in combat. Working from an American postcard depicting the conversion of a tractor to a 'tractor-tank', Bob Semple and TG Beck (Christchurch District Works Engineer), improvised the design of the tanks. Using resources available to Bob Semple as Minister of Public Works, the tanks were quickly produced in their Christchurch workshops.

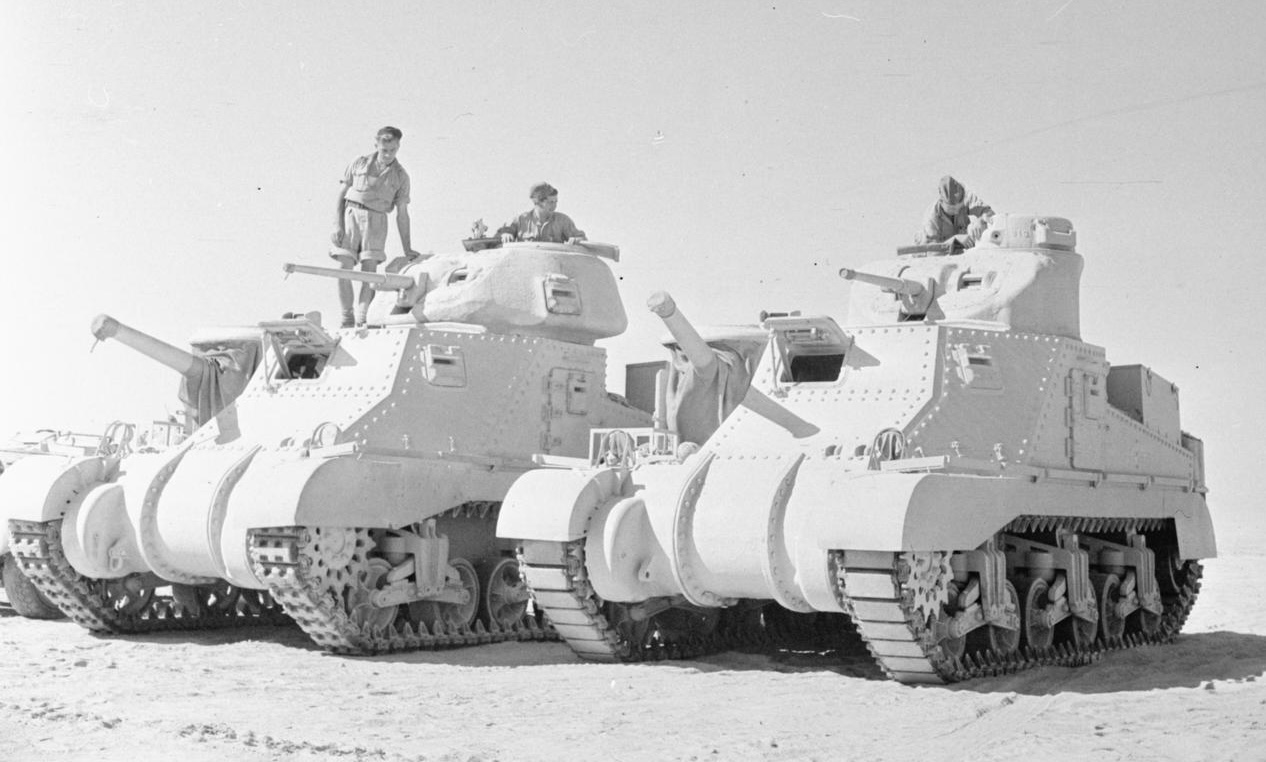
A M3 Grant (left) and Lee (right) at El Alamein (Egypt), in the Sahara Desert, 1942, showing differences between the British turret and the original design.

The Vickers Mk VI British Light Tank was initially supplied to the New Zealand forces and used as a scout tank in North Africa, to gather up scattered troops, leaving the main attacks to the heavier tanks. The New Zealand forces also were supplied with the M3 Stuart Tank, an American light tank, which was used by the reconnaissance force of the New Zealand Division in North Africa. The New Zealand Division fought in Greece, Crete, the Western Desert and Italy. In the Western Desert Campaign, the division was given the new American M3 Lee/Grant tanks and played a prominent role in the defeat of German and Italian forces in the Second Battle of El Alamein and the British Eighth Army's advance to Tunisia.

In June 1942 twenty-two M3 Hybrid Light Stuart Tanks were the first to arrive in New Zealand, and in October 1941 twenty Valentine Mk II tanks arrived in New Zealand, they were issued to the 1st Army Tank Brigade. More British Valentine tanks arrived and New Zealand received 98 Mk IIs, 80 Mk IIIs and 77 Mk Vs. A total of 18 Mk IIIs were converted with heavier 3 pounder guns. The New Zealand armoured forces also received and operated with the M4 Sherman and Firefly tank in Italy in 1944 with the 2nd New Zealand Division. Later in the war the Valentine infantry tank produced in the United Kingdom with the 2-pounder gun was sent to the Pacific theater and used by the 3rd New Zealand Division.

== Design and construction ==
New Zealand, like its neighbour Australia, had no indigenous armoured fighting vehicle industry, and so it had to allow makeshift tanks such as the Schofield tank. It was expected that armoured fighting vehicles would be provided from the UK. Australia and New Zealand did have some heavy industry that could be turned to the production of armour and armoured vehicles but little had been done. The idea of mechanising the New Zealand Army had been suggested before the war but there hadn't been much progress. The use of the US Disston "Six Ton Tractor Tank" a 1937 vehicle constructed of an armoured box on a Caterpillar Model 35 chassis which had been sold to Afghanistan and China was suggested.

New Zealand had built some improvised armoured trucks and unable to get any tracked carriers from Australia were building their own with armour plate imported from Australia. After the Fall of France in mid-1940, and the loss of most British tanks there, there was no likelihood of production being spared for New Zealand. Rather than obtain the armoured superstructures from the US, it was felt they could produce their own using local materials and resources.

== Armoured formations ==
=== 2nd New Zealand Division ===
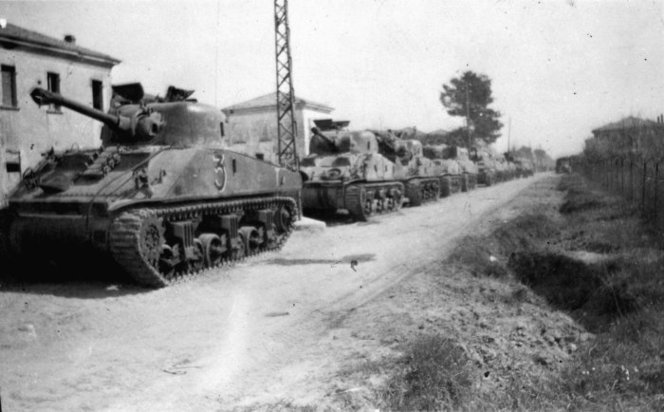
Sherman Tanks of 18th Armoured Regiment waiting to move up for the crossing at Senio, Italy

The 4th New Zealand Armoured Brigade came into being on 5 October 1942 after the 4th New Zealand Infantry Brigade was converted into an armoured brigade. They were part of the 2nd New Zealand Division, which had already seen action in the Battle of Greece, the Battle of Crete and in the North African Campaign, having a leading part in the Second Battle of El Alamein.

The brigade arrived in Italy in October 1943 and took part in a number of battles over the course of a sixteen-month campaign in Italy. Upon formation the 4th New Zealand Armoured Brigade was initially composed only of one regiment, the 19th Armoured Regiment. However, by the time it deployed to Italy in October 1943 it was composed of the following units:

- 18th New Zealand Armoured Regiment
- 19th New Zealand Armoured Regiment
- 20th New Zealand Armoured Regiment
- 22nd New Zealand Motor Battalion (October 1943 – November 1944).

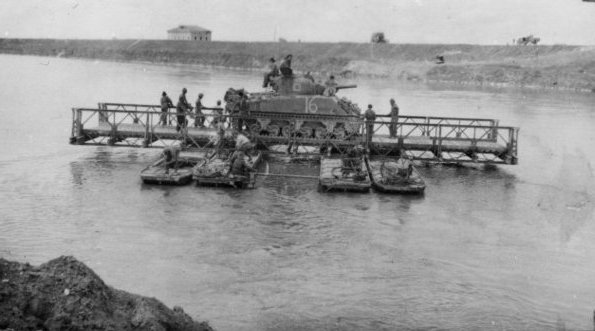
Transporting a 20th Armoured Regiment Sherman over the Po River, 1945

The armoured regiments were organized along British lines although with fewer tanks than their British counterparts. A New Zealand armoured regiment consisted of 52 Sherman tanks. These composed a Regimental HQ troop of four tanks and three Squadrons of sixteen tanks. In addition the regiment contained a Recce Troop equipped with Stuart V light tanks in both turreted and turret less configurations and an Intercommunication troop equipped with Lynx light scout cars. Each Squadron consisted of a Squadron Headquarters with four tanks and four troops each of three tanks.

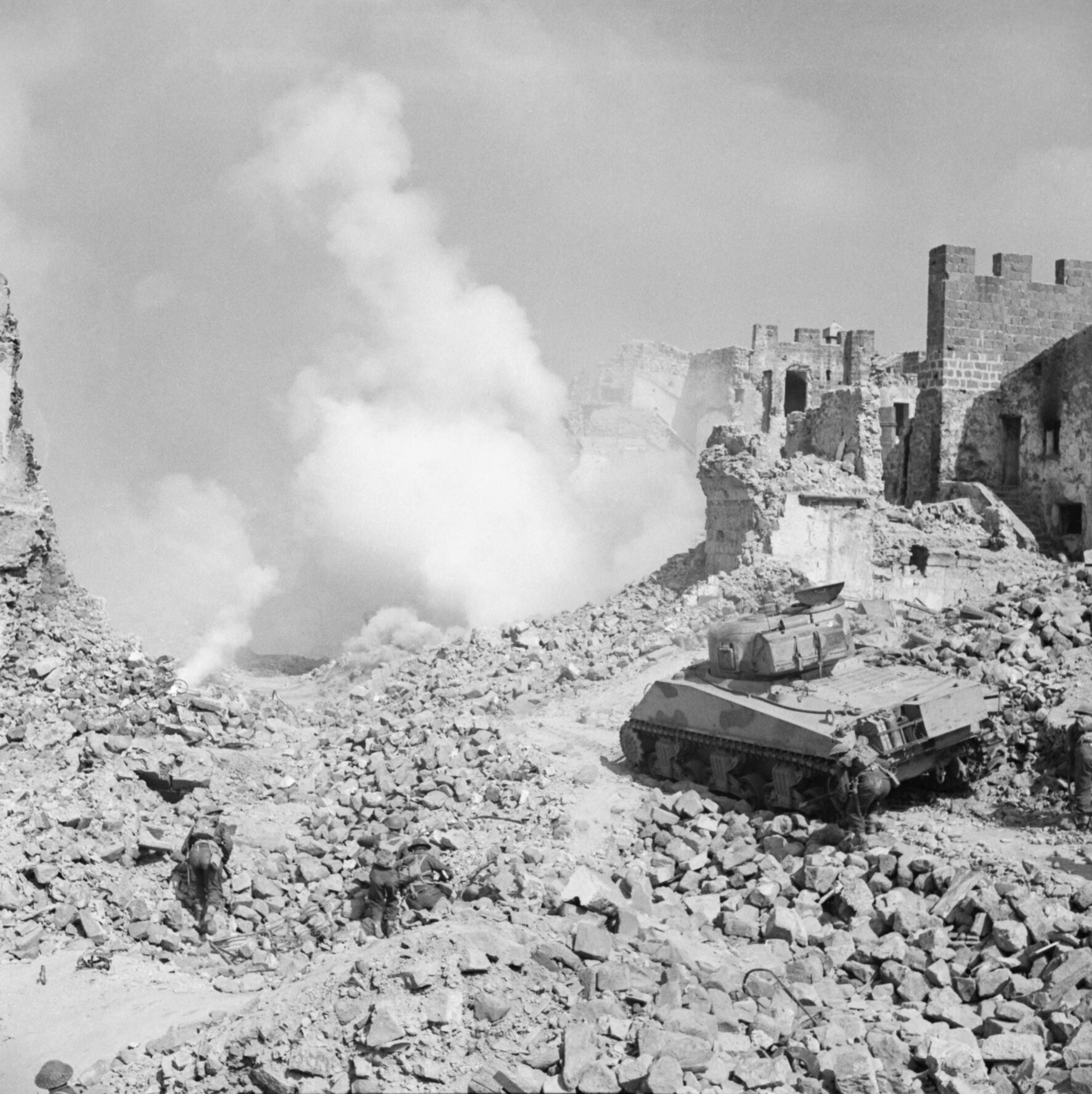
A Sherman tank of 19th Armoured Regiment supporting infantry of 6th NZ Infantry Brigade during a reconstruction of the action at Cassino, Italy, 8 April 1944

They took part in many battles and together with units of the U.S. 1st Armored Division and Commonwealth troops, formed the New Zealand Corps and were tasked with the capture of the town of Cassino, its skyline dominated by a 13th Century Monastery.

Then they took part Spring 1945 offensive in Italy and the New Zealand armoured brigade advanced to the city of Trieste, where they accepted the surrender of the German garrison. Members of Josip Broz Tito’s Yugoslav partisan army had also occupied the city and the presence of the New Zealanders in an area the Yugoslavs considered their spoils of war was not welcome. Tensions remained high, at one point escalating to a face off between 25 Yugoslav T-34s, which had entered the city, and the 19th Armoured Regiment.

In 1944 the 7th Anti-Tank Regiment, which had previously only operated towed anti-tank guns, was partially equipped with M10 tank destroyers. The regiment contained three batteries, each equipped with four M10s (as well as four towed 17 pounder anti tank guns) and also received a single 17 pounder variant of the M10. The regiment primarily acted in a fire support role during the latter stages of the Italian campaign.

An armoured engineer squadron, 28th Assault Squadron, New Zealand Engineers was also formed in March 1945. The squadron was equipped with specialist armoured vehicles including 3 Stuarts, 2 Sherman Kangaroos, 4 Sherman dozers, 4 Sherman fascine carriers, 4 Sherman ARKs and 4 Valentine Bridge layers. It was initially intended for the squadron to receive Churchill ARVEs and ARKs, but they were not available and Sherman fascine carriers and Sherman ARKs were used instead.

=== 3rd New Zealand Division ===
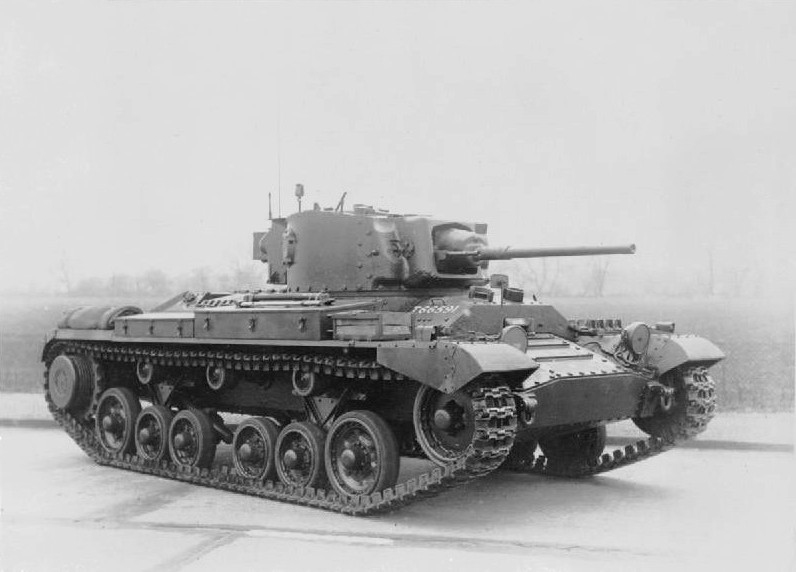
A Valentine tank, the MK V was a Valentine III with an American 138 hp GMC 6004 diesel engine and US-made transmission.

The 3rd New Zealand Division was a division of the New Zealand Military Forces. Formed in 1942, it saw action against the Japanese in the Pacific Ocean Areas during the Second World War. After completing its initial training in New Zealand the 3rd NZ Division moved to New Caledonia for garrison duty and further training in December 1942 and January 1943. The division saw action in the Solomon Islands campaign during 1943–44 with its tanks being used in Guadalcanal. The 3rd NZ Division moved to Guadalcanal in August 1943 with its Tank Squadron with Valentine Mk V tanks who provided armoured support for 3rd NZ Division. From this base, as part of the U.S. I Marine Amphibious Corps (I MAC), the division provided the ground component for three campaigns against small island groups in the Northern Solomons (in all operations the United States Navy provided the naval forces while squadrons from the Royal New Zealand Air Force formed only a small part of the US dominated air forces). While the islands were only lightly held by the Japanese and New Zealand casualties were relatively light, the New Zealand ground troops had to overcome challenging terrain and climatic conditions in these operations. After 1944 it was disbanded and around 4,000 men were sent to Italy to reinforce the 2nd Division.

=== Light Armoured Fighting Vehicle Regiments ===
At the beginning of the Second World War the New Zealand Mounted Rifles Regiments were still primarily horse mounted units. At the outbreak of the war three of the regiments were converted to motorised units, but in December 1941 all nine regiments were converted to Light Armoured Fighting Vehicle (LAFV) Regiments. The regiments were initially equipped with locally produced Beaverette armoured cars, Universal Carriers and impressed civilian vehicles, but from June 1942 began to receive M3 Stuart tanks. In December 1942 the regiments were reorganised, with five (2nd, 3rd, 5th, 9th and 11th) organised as armoured regiments and four as recee regiments (1st, 4th, 6th and 10th). The armoured regiments were organised with two squadrons of Stuart tanks and one squadron of Valentines, while the recee regiments were organised with one squadron of Stuarts, one of Beaverettes and one (mortar) squadron with Universal Carriers. The regiments also utilized bridging variants of the Valentine and Covenantor tank. In July 1943 all nine regiments were reduced to training cadres and then amalgamated into three regiments in March 1944.

=== 1st New Zealand Army Tank Brigade ===
The 1st New Zealand Army Tank Brigade was formed in October 1941 and consisted of the 1st, 2nd and 3rd Tank Battalions. Initially it was intended for the brigade to join the 2nd New Zealand Division in North Africa, but after Japan's entry into the war was instead held in New Zealand. The tank battalions were initially equipped with Valetines tanks but in December 1942 they were reorganised with two squadrons of Stuarts and one of Valentines. At the same time the brigade was disbanded and the battalions assigned to other formations. The battalions were themselves were disbanded in June 1943, although some of the 2nd Tank Battalion was used to form the 3rd New Zealand Division Tank Squadron.

== New Zealand tanks ==
=== Bob Semple tank ===
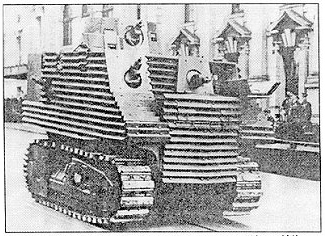
A Bob Semple tank in New Zealand

Due to the limitations of requirements and resources, the Bob Semple tank was a functional failure. By using a large tractor as a base, and bolting on a hastily designed and poorly constructed tank superstructure, the resultant tanks were inadequately armored, extremely heavy (20–25 ton), unstable, restricted by tractor gearing to slow speeds, and had to stop to change gears. Furthermore, due to the shape of the underlying tractor and undue vibrations, shooting from the tank was both difficult and inevitably inaccurate and it never saw action in the field. The Bob Semple was intended more for national morale than practicable combat.

=== Schofield Tank ===
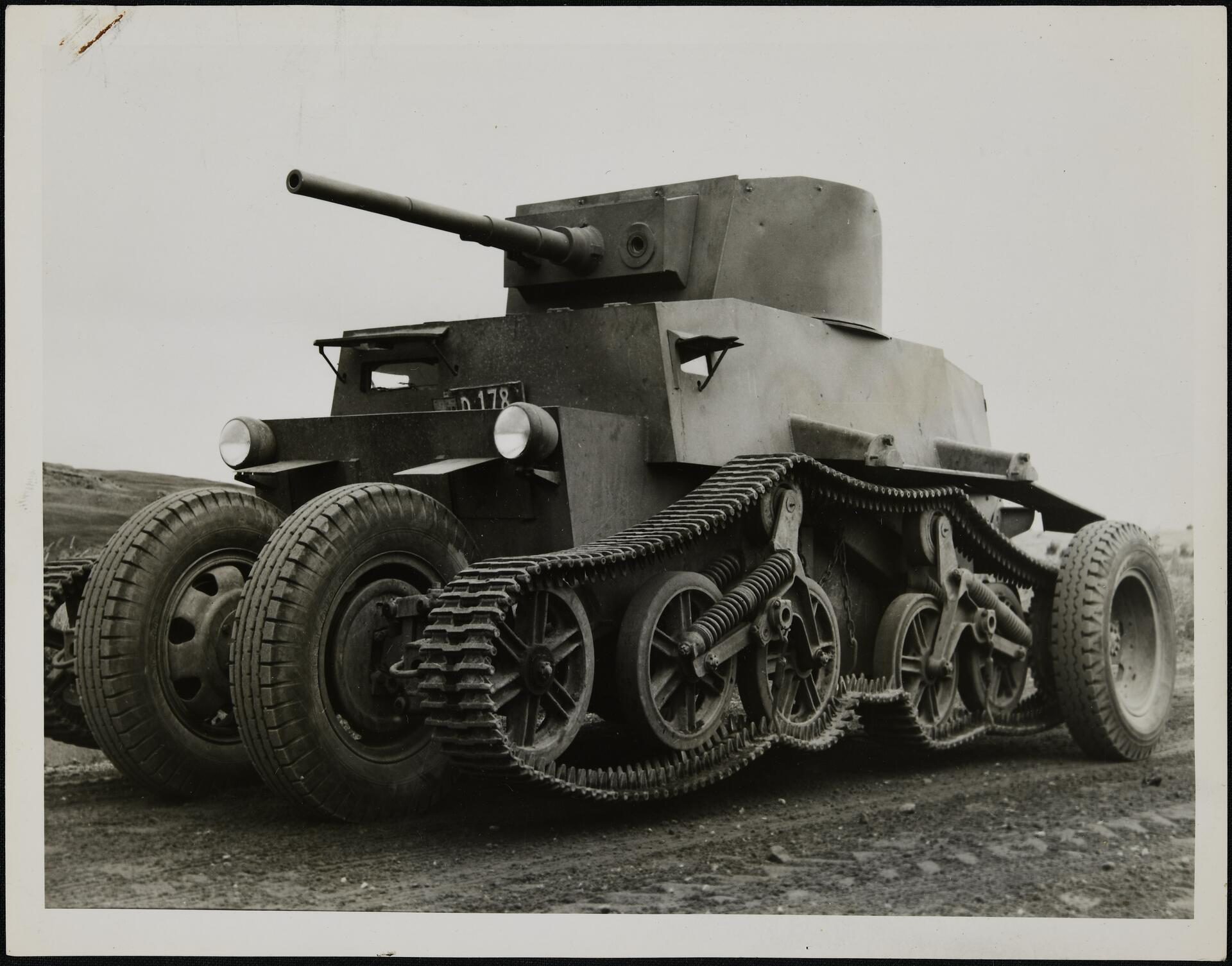
Schofield tank

The Schofield tank was a New Zealand indigenous design built in 1940 when it seemed certain the war might reach New Zealand but did not enter service. It was designed to run on either tracks or wheels.

=== Vickers Light Tank Mk VI ===
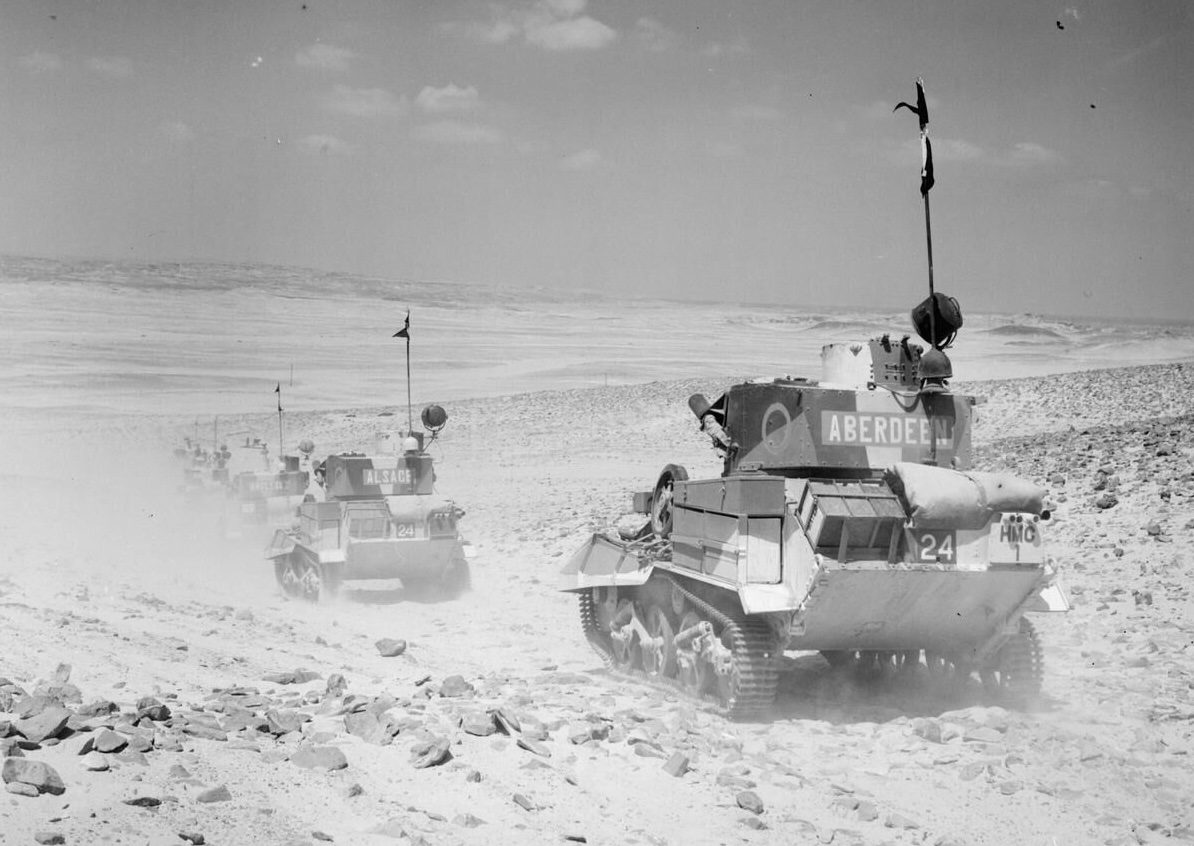
Vickers light tanks cross the desert, 1940

The New Zealand Division was supplied with the British Mk VI light tank built by Vickers-Armstrongs for the British Army during the interwar period. The Mark VI turret, was expanded in the Mk V to allow a three-man crew to operate the tank, was further expanded to give room in its rear for a wireless set. The weight of the tank was increased to 10,800 pounds (4,900 kg), which although heavier than previous models actually improved its handling characteristics, and an 88 horsepower (66 kW) engine was added to the model to increase its maximum speed to 35 miles per hour (56 km/h). It had the Horstmann coil-spring suspension system which was found to be durable and reliable, although the fact that the tank was short in relation to its width and that it pitched violently on rough ground made accurate gunnery whilst moving exceptionally difficult. The Mk VI possessed a crew of three consisting of a driver, gunner and commander who also doubled as the radio operator, between 4 millimetres (0.16 in) and 14 millimetres (0.55 in) of armour, which could resist rifle and machine gun bullets, and its armament consisted of one water-cooled .303 inch and one .50 inch Vickers machine gun.

=== M3 Stuart Light Tank ===
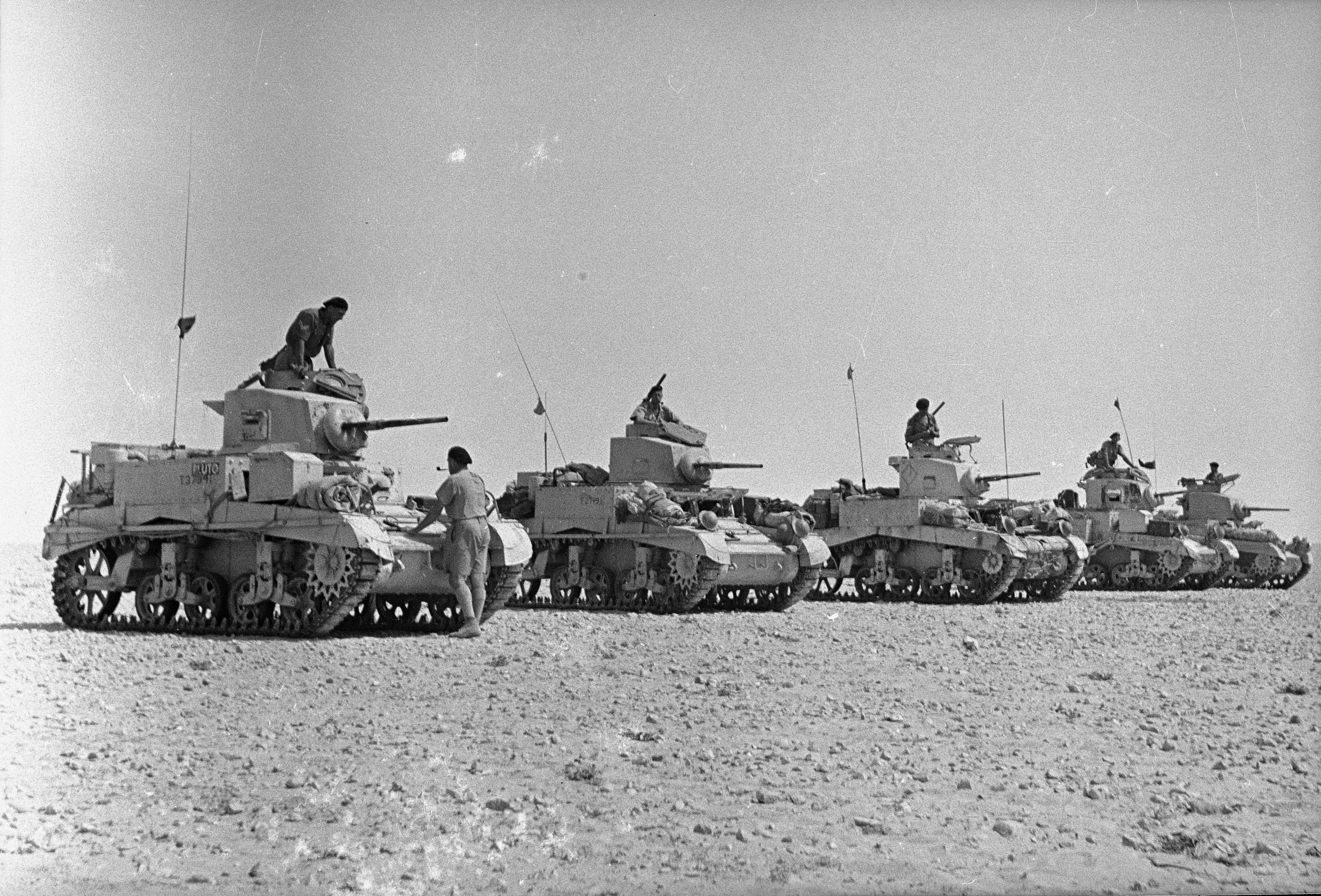
M3 Stuarts of the Divisional Cavalry Regiment in North Africa

The M3 Stuart tank was the most common tank used by New Zealand during the Second World War. It was operated by the 2nd New Zealand Division in North Africa and Italy, as well as by the home defence units based in New Zealand.

The Divisional Cavalry Regiment first received four Stuart Is in November 1941 and saw combat during Operation Crusader. These tanks had been recaptured from the Germans and it was not until July 1942 that the regiment was officially issued with Stuarts. The Stuart remained the mainstay of the regiment until the end of the North African Campaign in 1943 when they were replaced with Staghound armoured cars and Lynx scout cars. Following the Battle of Monte Cassino, the 18th, 19th and 20th Armoured Regiments each operated a number of improved Stuart Vs. Each armoured regiment contained a reconnaissance troop, organised with 3 turreted Stuarts and 8 turretless variants. The turretless tanks were often used as resupply vehicles. Stuarts were also operated by the Divisional protective troop, which acted as General Freyberg's bodyguard, and by the 4th, 5th, 6th, 7th and 14th artillery regiments as troop and battery command vehicles.

The first Stuarts arrived in New Zealand in June 1942 with a total of 292 Stuart IIIs and 109 Stuart Hybrids received by July 1943. These Stuarts were issued to the Light Armoured Fighting Vehicle Regiments and to the Tank Battalions of the 1st New Zealand Army Tank Brigade. The Stuarts remained in New Zealand service until 1955.

=== Matilda Tank ===
A total of 33 Matilda II MK IV CS tanks were acquired by the New Zealand Military Forces between October 1942 and March 1943. Six were issued to 1st Tank Battalion and two to each of the 2nd, 3rd, 9th and 11th Light Armoured Fighting Vehicle Regiments. The remaining 19 tanks were held by the Armoured Fighting School at Waiouru for training purposes, or as spares at Trentham. The Matilda tanks were found to be too heavy for New Zealand bridges and would be impractical to operate in the Pacific. The 3-inch howitzers were removed from 18 of the Matildas and repurposed in Valentine tanks. Initially these Matildas were to be rearmed with new howitzers from Australia, but the plan was ultimately scrapped, and the Matilda tanks were declared obsolete in August 1943.

=== Valentine Tank ===
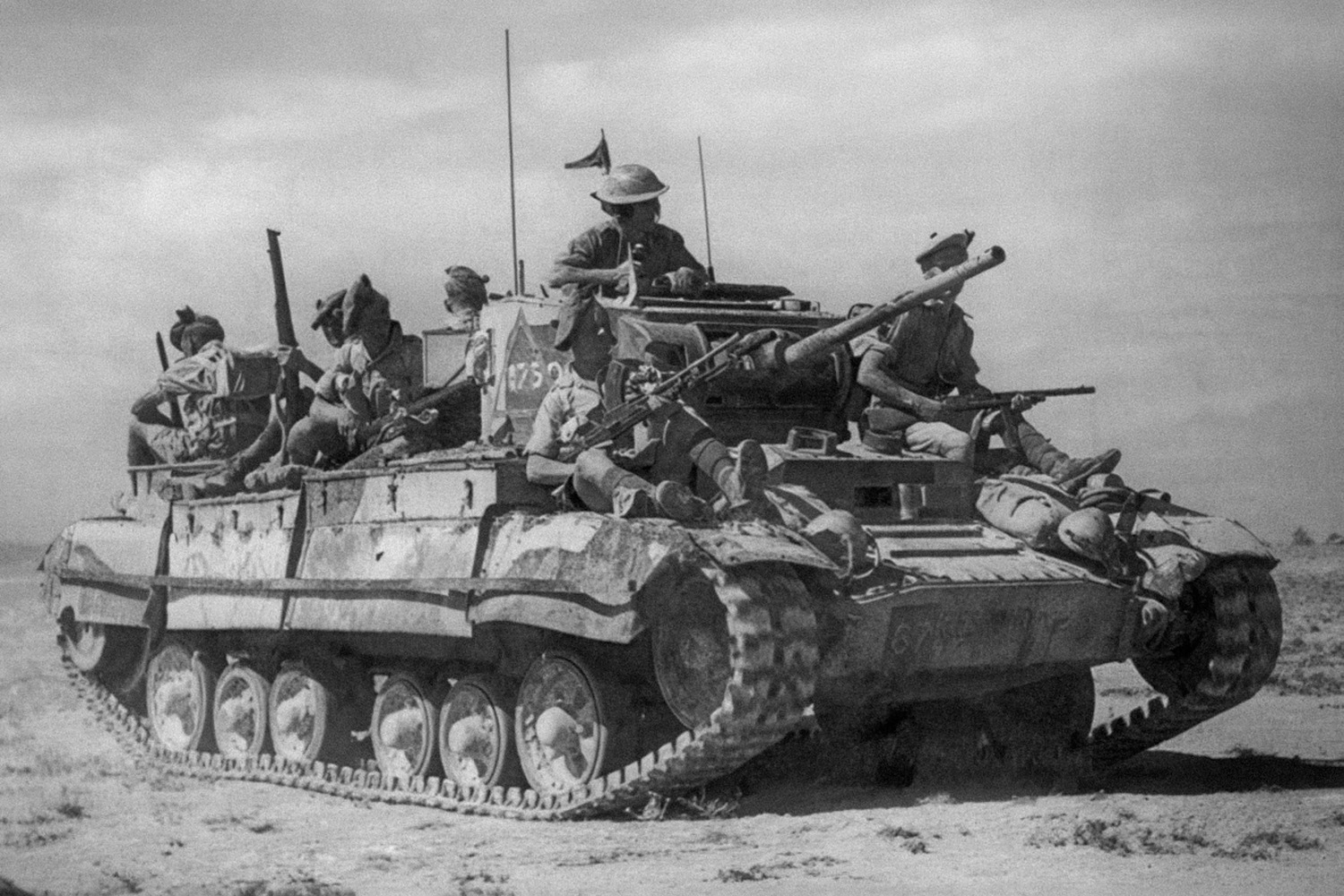
A Valentine in North Africa

The Valentine tank was the second most prolific tank (after the M3 Stuart) used by New Zealand during the Second World War. From October 1941 to March 1943, 255 Valentines were imported into New Zealand of which 100 were Mk II, 74 Mk III and 81 Mk V. They were initially used to equip the 1st New Zealand Army Tank Brigade and some of the Light Armoured Fighting Vehicle Regiments. In addition to the regular gun tanks, 11 Valentine bridge layers were imported to New Zealand and a further 4 were used by the 28th Assault Squadron in Italy.

The Valentine Mk III CS was a New Zealand produced variant of the Valentine. In January 1943 the New Zealand Military Forces anticipated the need for a close support tank during operations in the pacific. The 2-pounder gun of the Valentine was considered inadequate, while the Matilda Mk IV CS, which was also in New Zealand service, was deemed to be too heavy for pacific operations. A compromise was achieved by remounting the 3-inch howitzer from a Matilda into the turret of a Valentine. The recoil system of the 2-pounder was similar to that of the 3-inch howitzer and the guns were found to be interchangeable, although some modification of the gun sights was necessary. In all 18 Valentine Mk IIIs were converted to Mk III CSs.

Of the Valentine tanks imported into New Zealand, only a small number ever saw combat. The 3rd Divisional Tank Squadron, of the 3rd New Zealand Division, was equipped with 25 Valentine Mk IIIs, and 9 Valentine Mk III CSs and took part in the Battle of the Green Islands in February 1944.

The Valentine tanks remained in New Zealand service well into the 1950s, with the last tanks finally withdrawn in 1963.

=== Covenantor ===
The New Zealand Military Forces acquired 13 bridge laying variants of the Covenanter tank in late 1942. They were used alongside Valentine bridge layers to provide bridging support to the armoured forces stationed in New Zealand.

=== M4 Sherman ===
The 4th New Zealand Armoured Brigade was equipped with various variants of the M4 Sherman tank throughout the Italian Campaign. The bulk of these tanks were diesel powered Sherman IIIs armed with a 75mm gun. In October 1944 the brigade received its first batch of 16 up-gunned Sherman Fireflys armed with the 17 pounder anti-tank gun. Initially Sherman ICs were provided, but these were later replaced by Sherman VCs. An additional 16 Sherman VCs were acquired in March 1945 and a further 16 in April 1945. The brigade also received a total of 18 Sherman IBs in early 1945 armed with a 105 mm howitzer.

The 28th Assault Squadron utilised engineering variants of the M4 Sherman tank. These included Sherman Vs equipped with a dozer blade to clear obstacles and Sherman Kangaroos, turretless Shermans used as armoured personnel carriers. The squadron also used turretless Sherman II fascine carriers and Sherman I ARKs (armoured ramp carriers). The Sherman ARKs had a bridge built across the chassis in place of the turret. When driven into a ditch, the tank would act as a temporary bridge over which other vehicles could pass. Two ARKs were sometimes stacked, one on top of the other, to bridge particularly deep gaps.

=== M10 tank destroyer ===
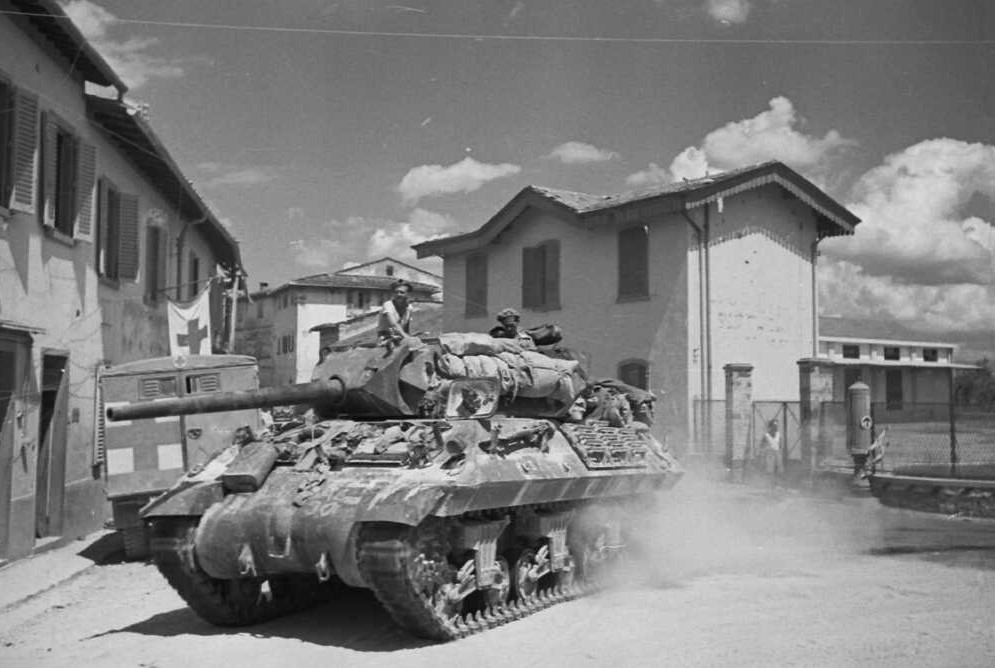
M10 tank destroyer of 7th Anti-Tank Regiment

The 7th Anti-Tank Regiment was partially equipped with M10 tank destroyers from 1944. The regiment also received a single 17pdr SP Achilles, a variant of the M10 armed with the more powerful Ordnance QF 17-pounder anti-tank gun.

=== Centurion ===
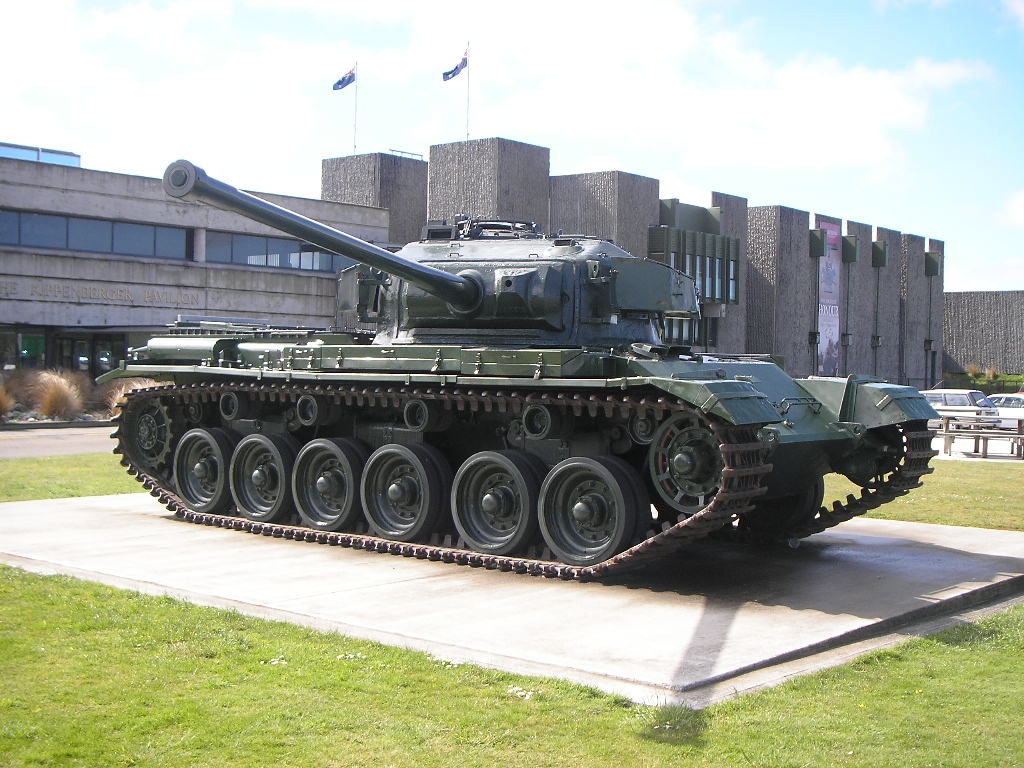
Centurion tank on display at the QEII Army Memorial Museum – Waiouru, New Zealand

The 4th Armoured Brigade was formed during the Second World War in October 1942 from the remnants of the 4th New Zealand Infantry Brigade and was officially disbanded after the war. The 4th Armoured Brigade was reformed in April 1953 and gradually the old Valentine tanks were replaced by more modern British Centurion main battle tanks, along with the M41 Walker Bulldog tanks. New Zealand purchased its first Mk3 Centurion in 1950. The Centurion was intended to aid in training Armoured Corps men for service with one of the British regiments stationed in Korea. Named Scipio Africanus, the first tank was joined by two more Mk 3s in 1953, named Scorpion and Scarab respectively. In 1963 the Army purchased 8 Centurions from spare British reserve stocks in Hong Kong. These were a mixture of Mk 5 and 5/1s. Most of these had the Type A barrel though some were equipped with the Type B. In addition a single MK I Armoured Recovery Vehicle was also purchased. These were removed from service in 1968, with eight being sold to the Australian Army (including the recovery vehicle). The recovery vehicle served with the Australian Army in Vietnam while the others were used to rebuild other Centurions which had sustained battle damage. Of the four vehicles left in New Zealand, two were preserved, while two were used as training targets on the weapons ranges at Waiouru. One Centurion stands outside the Queen Elizabeth II Army Memorial Museum in Waiouru.

=== M41 Walker Bulldog ===
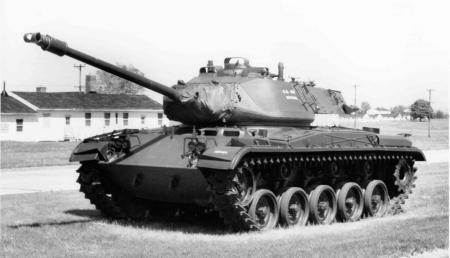
M41 Walker Bulldog Light Tank

In 1960, the Royal New Zealand Armoured Corps acquired ten M41 Walker Bulldog from the United States to replace the rapidly aging Stuart and Valentine tanks which had been inherited as a result of its close association with the British Army during Second World War. The M41 was designed to be air-transportable with consideration given to New Zealand's upcoming purchase of the C-130 Hercules, and the desired anti-tank capabilities were provided by installing a long 76 mm gun with an advanced rangefinder. The decision to acquire the new tanks was made a year earlier, in 1959, and this allowed army maintenance technicians to be sent to the U.S. well in advance and receive the necessary familiarisation training at Fort Knox before the tanks reached New Zealand. After being replaced by Scorpion CRV(T) on 1982, M41s were not scrapped. Instead, they were sold to private collectors (2), kept by the military for range targets (1), or transferred to museums and trusts in New Zealand and abroad (7). (tank statuses as of 1996 in parentheses)

=== FV101 Scorpion ===
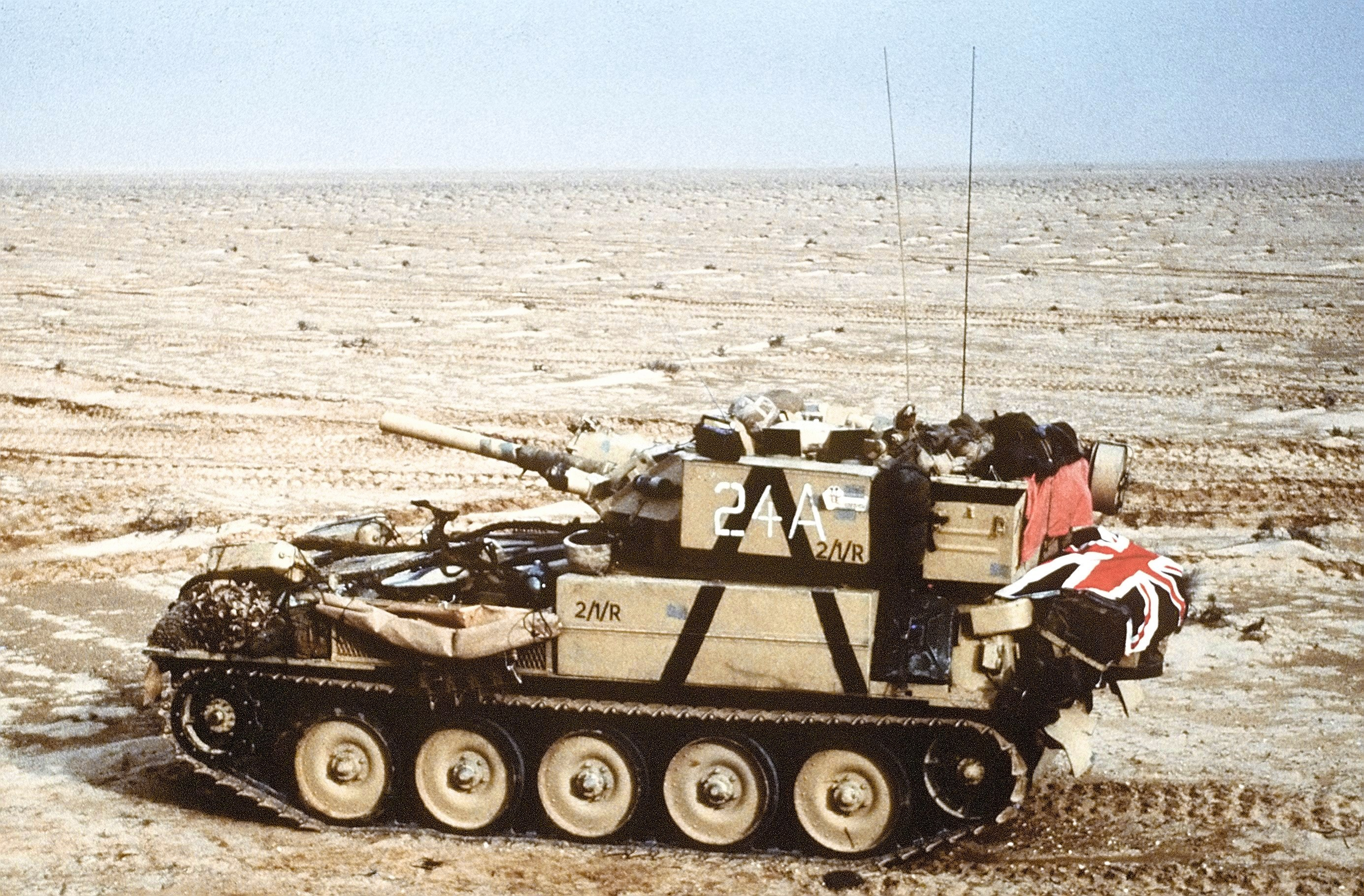
A British Army FV101 Scorpion, similar in specification to those operated by New Zealand

By 1978, New Zealand's M41s were no longer deemed effective due to their increasing age and deterioration of equipment, as well as the budget to continue the maintenance and operation of a tank of its size. The Ministry of Defence preferred a lighter replacement vehicle, and in 1982 M41s were replaced by the FV101 Scorpion at the cost of $8 million NZD. 26 Scorpions were acquired by New Zealand. It was used in the function as a reconnaissance vehicle or a light tank.

The Scorpion's steering gear and their Jaguar petrol engines gave frequent problems, and they were never used on active service, remaining within the country for training and exercise purposes. Three soldiers were killed in vehicular accidents in them in 1990, 1991 and 1994. They eventually became obsolete, mostly due to the limited effectiveness of their smaller caliber gun, and most were sold off to other countries via an arms dealer in 2000. At least one ended up with a New Zealand private collector.

== Switch to infantry fighting vehicles ==
In 2003, the New Zealand government chose to reorient its armoured fleet with the Canadian-built NZLAV, replacing its M113 armored personnel carriers and FV101 Scorpions. The switch to infantry fighting vehicles marked the end of the use of tanks by the New Zealand Army.

== See also ==
- Schofield tank – New Zealand indigenous tank design
- Sentinel tank – Australian indigenous tank design
- Bob Semple tank – New Zealand indigenous tank design
- History of the tank
- Tanks in World War I
- List of interwar armoured fighting vehicles
- Tanks in World War II
- Tank classification
- List of military vehicles
- New Zealand Defence Force
