= 3rd Armoured Regiment (New Zealand) =

- Active: 1944–1956
- Disbanded: 1965
- Country: New Zealand
- Branch: Royal New Zealand Armoured Corps
- Type: Armoured warfare
- Part of: 4th Armoured Brigade
- Garrison/HQ: Christchurch

The 3rd Armoured Regiment was a Territorial Force regiment of the Royal New Zealand Armoured Corps, New Zealand Army. The Regiment was formed on 29 March 1944 by amalgamating the Canterbury Yeomanry Cavalry, Otago Mounted Rifles and the Nelson-Marlborough Mounted Rifles. It was equipped with a mixture of Valentine and Stuart tanks, but was demobilized later that year. The regiment only existed on paper until 1949 when Compulsory military training was reintroduced. The reformed regiment was placed under 4th Armoured Brigade and continued to use the same tanks it had used during the Second World War. By 1956 New Zealand had refocused its defense focus on South East Asia where it was thought that armoured units would be less effective. 3rd Armoured Regiment was placed into suspended animation and later disbanded in 1965.
