= Royal New Zealand Armoured Corps =

- Active: 1 January 1942 – present
- Country: New Zealand
- Branch: New Zealand Army
- Colors: Brown, Red and Green
- Anniversaries: Cambrai Day 20 November
- Engagements: Battle Honours are awarded to individual RNZAC units

Commanders
- Colonel Commandant: Lieutenant General(Rtd.)Richard Rhys Jones CNZM

The Royal New Zealand Armoured Corps (RNZAC) is the overall umbrella grouping of Regular Force and Territorial Force units equipped with armoured vehicles in the New Zealand Army. The corps was formed in 1942 as the New Zealand Armoured Corps, before being given the Royal prefix in 1947. The RNZAC is second in seniority of corps within the New Zealand Army.

The Divisional Cavalry Regiment and the 4th Armoured Brigade were among the foremost NZ armoured units during World War II, though at home the 1st Army Tank Brigade was also established.

Although the RNZAC did not deploy one of its own units to the Vietnam War, from 1965 to 1971 RNZAC personnel served within other New Zealand and Australian units including artillery, infantry, command and support, and logistics. Several members served as tank crew with the 3rd Cavalry Regiment of the Royal Australian Armoured Corps, and 1st Squadron, 4th Cavalry Regiment (U.S Army.) Two RNZAC pilots served with the Australian 161st (Independent) Reconnaissance Flight.

During the 1990s, corps personnel contributed to the deployment of a mechanized infantry company group to Bosnia-Hercegovina for UNPROFOR as part of the NZDF Operation Radian.

Among the surviving Territorial Force units at the end of the 20th Century was the Wai/WEC Squadron, later the Waikato Mounted Rifles in Hamilton, and the fast-diminishing New Zealand Scottish Regiment, also at squadron size technically but actually dwindling into single figures, in the South Island. The New Zealand Scots were finally disbanded in 2016.

== Current units ==
RNZAC personnel serve in:1st Battalion RNZIR

Regular Force

- Queen Alexandra's Mounted Rifles Company .

Territorial Force

- Waikato Mounted Rifles Company . ( Mounted Reconnaissance)

On 5 December 2025 the Queen Alexandra's Mounted Rifles (QAMR) were formally amalgamated into the 1st Battalion Royal New Zealand Infantry Regiment, which would now become a motorized infantry battalion: "The new unit will retain the name 1 RNZIR and will be organised as a Motorised Infantry Battalion, with one of its sub-units retaining the QAMR name."

As of 16 January 2026, Brigadier General G. A. Motley, Chief of Staff, HQNZDF, replied (in response to a FYI New Zealand information request): "The Royal New Zealand Armoured Corps remains active. The Waikato Mounted Rifles remains a reserve sub-unit reporting under the 1st Battalion Royal New Zealand Infantry Regiment; the sub-unit does not currently appear on the NZ Army Organisational Map as it is in the process of being updated."

== Equipment ==
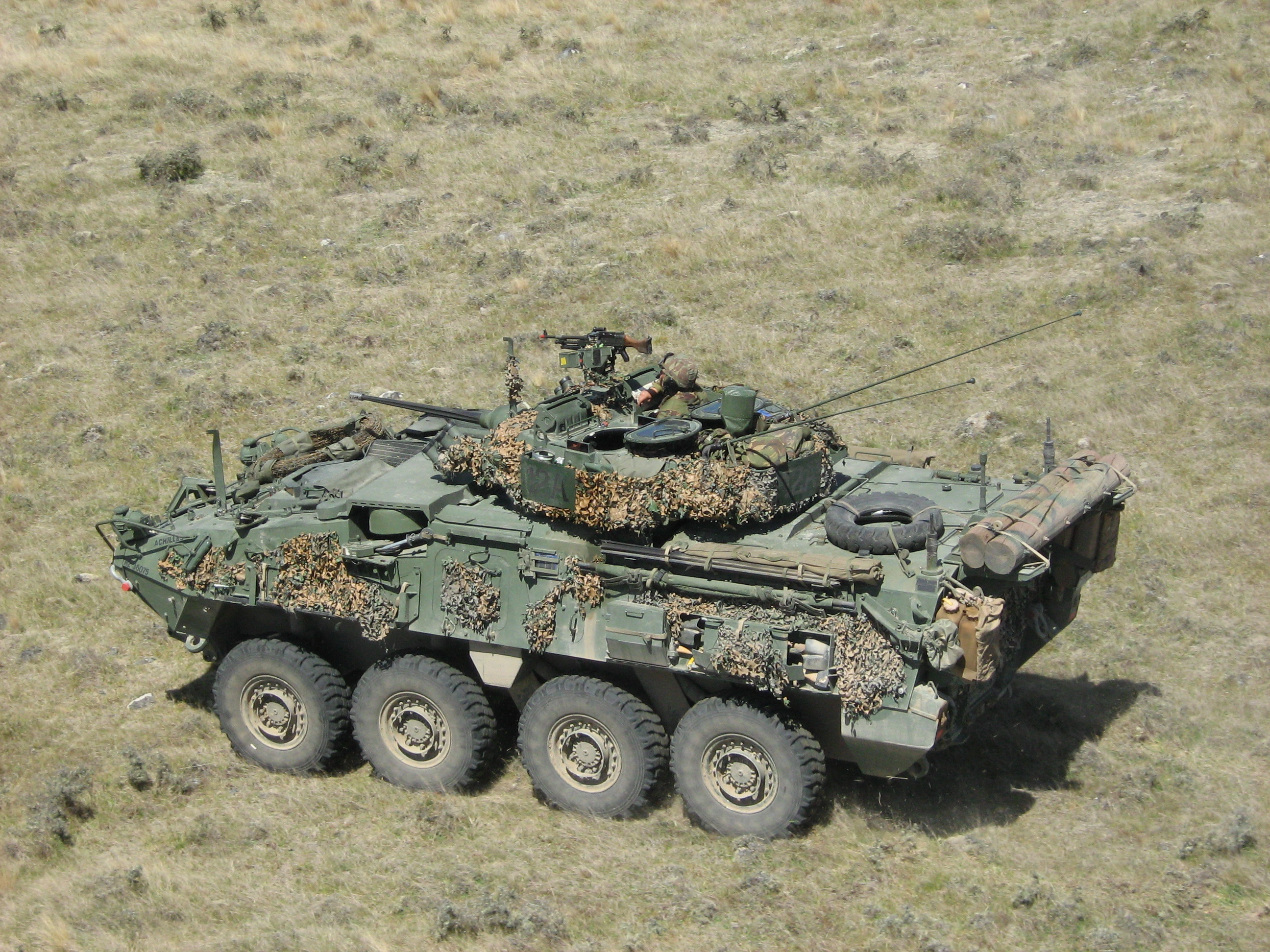
A NZLAV

The RNZAC is primarily equipped with :

- NZLAV - the NZLAV armoured fighting vehicle (AFV) is a variant of the General Dynamics LAV III

== Alliances ==
- United Kingdom - The Royal Tank Regiment
- United Kingdom - The King's Royal Hussars
- United Kingdom - The Royal Dragoon Guards

== See also ==
- Royal Armoured Corps
- Royal Australian Armoured Corps
- Royal Canadian Armoured Corps
- Tanks of New Zealand

== Lineage of units ==
The units of the Royal New Zealand Armoured Corps have a complicated and intermingled heritage. The following table shows the relationship between units since 1944. Titles in bold denote regiments, while non-bold titles are individual squadrons.

Lineage chart

1944	**New Zealand Scottish Regiment** (Infantry Corps)	**Waikato Regiment** (Infantry Corps)	**1st Armoured Regiment**	**2nd Armoured Regiment**	**3rd Armoured Regiment**
1948	**1st Divisional Regiment (New Zealand Scottish)**
1950	**1st Armoured Car Regiment (New Zealand Scottish)**
1951	**1st Armoured Regiment (Waikato)**
1953	**Divisional Regiment**
1956	Suspended animation	**4th Armoured Regiment**	Suspended animation
1958	**2nd Armoured Regiment**
1958	**Queen Alexandra's Armoured Regiment**
1959	**Waikato Regiment**	**Queen Alexandra's Regiment**	**Wellington East Coast Regiment (City of Hasting's Own)**
1960	**1st Armoured Regiment**; Waikato Squadron	**1st Armoured Regiment**; Queen Alexandra's Squadron	**1st Armoured Regiment**; Wellington East Coast Squadron
1963	1st Reconnaissance Squadron (New Zealand Scottish)	2nd Reconnaissance Squadron (New Zealand Scottish)	2nd Armoured Squadron (Waikato)	1st Armoured Squadron (Queen Alexandra's)
1965	Disbanded
1970	1st Squadron (New Zealand Scottish)	2nd Squadron (New Zealand Scottish)	Queen Alexandra's (Waikato/Wellington East Coast) Squadron
1982	Waikato/Wellington East Coast Squadron	Queen Alexandra's Squadron
1990	Disbanded	**1st Armoured Group**; New Zealand Scottish Squadron	**1st Armoured Group**; Waikato/Wellington East Coast Squadron	**1st Armoured Group**; A Squadron	**1st Armoured Group**; B Squadron
1993	**Queen Alexandra's Mounted Rifles**; New Zealand Scottish Squadron	**Queen Alexandra's Mounted Rifles**; Waikato/Wellington East Coast Squadron	**Queen Alexandra's Mounted Rifles**; A Squadron	**Queen Alexandra's Mounted Rifles**; B Squadron
1999	**4th Otago and Southland Battalion Group**; New Zealand Scottish Squadron	**6th Hauraki Battalion Group**; Waikato/Wellington East Coast Squadron	**Queen Alexandra's Mounted Rifles**; A Squadron	**Queen Alexandra's Mounted Rifles**; B Squadron
2003	**6th Hauraki Battalion Group**; Waikato Mounted Rifles Squadron
2004	Queen Alexandra's Mounted Rifles
2011	**Queen Alexandra's Mounted Rifles**; New Zealand Scottish Squadron	**Queen Alexandra's Mounted Rifles**; Wellington East Coast Squadron
2012	**Queen Alexandra's Mounted Rifles**; Waikato Mounted Rifles Squadron
2013	Disbanded
2026

== Order of precedence ==
Preceded by Royal Regiment of New Zealand Artillery	New Zealand Army Order of Precedence	Succeeded by Corps of Royal New Zealand Engineers
