= Battle of Tempe Gorge =

Coordinates: 39°52′37″N 22°33′58″E

- Part of the Balkans campaign during World War II
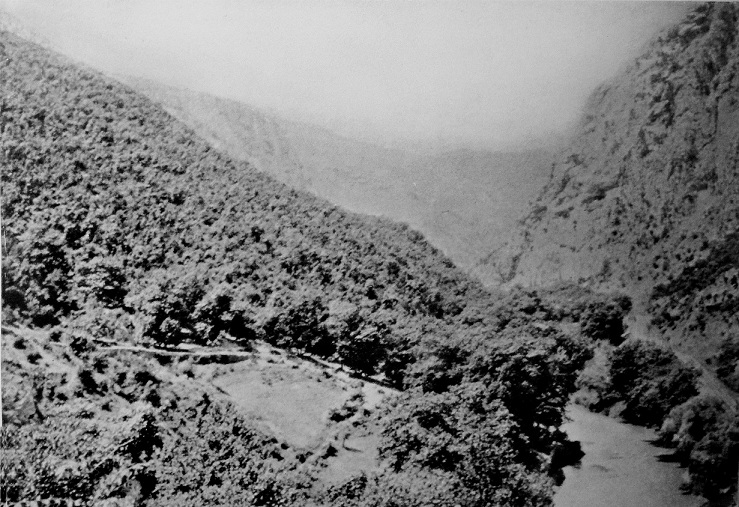
- Tempe Gorge c. 1941
Date	18 April 1941
Location	Tempe Gorge, Greece
Result	Allied victory; German advance delayed.

Belligerents
Australia; New Zealand	Germany

Commanders and leaders
(Australia) Arthur Samuel Allen	(Nazi Germany) Ferdinand Schörner (Nazi Germany) Hermann Balck

Units involved
Australian 16th Brigade; New Zealand 21st Battalion	2nd Panzer Division; 6th Mountain Division

Strength
1 brigade	1–2 divisions (elements)

Casualties and losses
Australian: 80 killed or wounded 120 captured New Zealand: 4 killed or wounded	140 killed or wounded

The Battle of Tempe Gorge, also known as the Battle of Pinios Gorge, was a rearguard action fought by Australian and New Zealand troops during the German invasion of Greece on 18 April 1941. The battle was fought amidst the advance of German forces through central Greece, and saw a brigade-sized element dubbed "Anzac Force" fight a delaying action against elements of two German divisions, supported by armoured forces. During a day of hard fighting, the defending Anzacs suffered heavy casualties and were forced back from the gorge, but their stand allowed other Allied forces to withdraw through Larissa, and afterwards a new defensive position was established around Thermopylae.

== Background ==
As the main Allied contingent retreated from German forces towards the south of Greece, a holding action was determined to be needed to delay the pursuing Germans at Tempe Gorge, a site deemed suitable for the defence. The force allocated for this action was dubbed "Anzac Force". It was relatively small, consisting of two 2nd Australian Imperial Force battalions from the Australian 16th Brigade – the 2/2nd and 2/3rd – fighting alongside New Zealand forces consisting of the 21st Battalion, the 26th Battery of the 4th Field Regiment and L Troop of the 7th Anti-Tank Regiment.

Some of the units had seen action recently in Libya against the Italians, before being hastily transported to Greece to help against the German invasion. Anzac Force was commanded by Brigadier Arthur Samuel Allen. The Australian units were armed with mortars, small arms and anti tank rifles, while the New Zealand force had artillery pieces, including 25 pounders, but were short of ammunition. The Boys anti-tank rifles were largely ineffective, and the Bren Gun Carriers were due for replacement. At that time, there was almost no British armour in Greece, many tanks having been destroyed by Waffen SS tanks at the Battle of Vevi on 13 April.

== Battle ==
On 18 April, the German 6th Mountain Division, commanded by General Ferdinand Schörner, lined up on the other side of the Pinios River, from the Anzac Force. The river was fordable at this point. The German aim was to attack the choke point at Larissa, where the main body of Anzacs were funnelling through, and cut off their retreat. Allen's aim was to hold the area with his unit to protect the main force's withdrawal.

The Anzac force lined up against the expected German crossing points. Companies were positioned rather thinly, with 1,000 yards (910 m) between each. The Australian 2/2nd Battalion was to support Allen's headquarters. It was at the most vital defence position, in the centre of the line, across from Gonnoi, from where the German forces would attack. The New Zealand 21st Battalion formed up on the right, and destroyed a bridge to prevent its use by the Germans. The 21st, however, had suffered earlier losses at Platamon and had lost much of its equipment. Two companies from the Australian 2/3rd Battalion were positioned on the left.

The attack began just after 7:00 am with an attack from Gonnos towards the 2/2nd Battalion; later, around noon, German units led by Lieutenant-Colonel Hermann Balck attacked the NZ 21st Battalion. Balck had previously pushed back the 21st some days earlier at Platamon where they had been surprised by the appearance of German vehicles due to the terrain.

The New Zealand 21st Battalion could not hold against Balcks's units, and was nearly overrun, retreating into the hills. At this point, some German tanks crossed the Pinios River, which the 21st had been guarding. This left the 2/2nd as the only unit left on the field to continue the battle. A unit of Bren Gun Carriers attempted to push back German troops crossing the river, but failed, with the loss of some of the carriers. Mortars were initially out of range of the German troops, but were purposely (and dangerously) overloaded with charge to give them greater range. Despite desperate holding actions, by 5:30 pm, the battle had degenerated into chaos, and the 2/2nd disintegrated under the German attacks.

== Aftermath ==
By 6:45 pm, orders were issued to those companies that could be contacted that they should withdraw. The Anzac forces had been badly depleted by the German attacks, but had managed to hold their ground for the day, allowing the main forces to escape through Larissa. The Australians and New Zealanders moved throughout the night, with elements fighting further delaying actions as they withdrew, and by dawn on 19 April occupied a new defensive position around Thermopylae. The 16th Brigade's casualties during the battle were around 80 killed or wounded and 120 captured. The New Zealand 21st Battalion lost four killed or wounded. German losses were around 140 killed or wounded. As a result of the battle, the 2/2nd Battalion was largely broken up, and did not fight as a complete unit again until after the end of the fighting in Greece.
