= Graham Beresford Parkinson =

Military leader

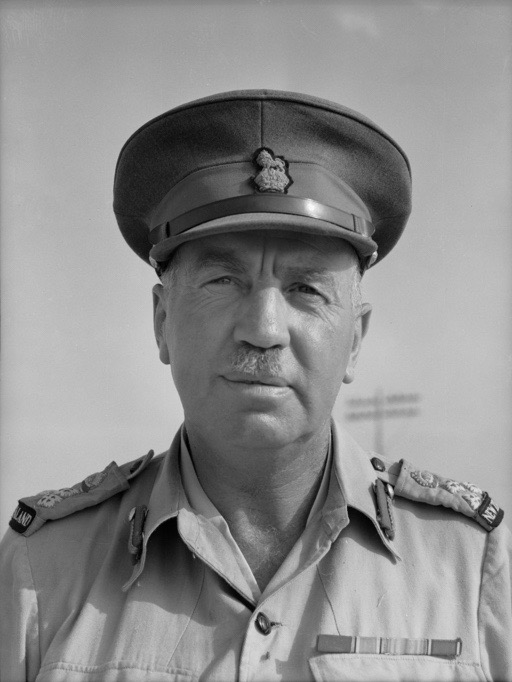
- Brigadier Graham Parkinson in Egypt, August 1943
- Born: 5 November 1896; Mount Cook, Wellington, New Zealand
- Died: 10 July 1979 (aged 82); Christchurch, New Zealand
- Military career
- Allegiance: New Zealand
- Branch: New Zealand Military Forces
- Service years: 1914–52
- Rank: Major General
- Commands: Southern Military District (1949–51); 2nd New Zealand Division (1944); 6th Infantry Brigade (1943–44, 1944–45); 1st New Zealand Army Tank Brigade (1942); 7th Infantry Brigade (1941–42); 4th Field Artillery Regiment (1940–41)
- Conflicts: First World War; Western Front; Second World War; Battle of Greece; Tunisian campaign; Italian campaign
- Awards: Commander of the Order of the British Empire; Distinguished Service Order & Bar; Mentioned in Despatches; Officer of the Legion of Merit (United States)

Major General Graham Beresford Parkinson, CBE, DSO & Bar, OStJ (5 November 1896 – 10 July 1979) was a professional soldier in the New Zealand Military Forces who served during the First and Second World Wars.

Born in Wellington, New Zealand, Parkinson was commissioned as a lieutenant in the New Zealand Military Forces in 1916 and served in the First World War as part of the New Zealand Field Artillery. He remained in the military during the interwar period and served in a number of staff and training positions. Following the outbreak of the Second World War, he commanded an artillery regiment in the Western Desert campaign and participated in the Battle of Greece. In late 1941 he returned to New Zealand to command newly raised formations, but returned to the Middle East in 1943. He commanded the 6th Infantry Brigade of the 2nd New Zealand Division during the Italian campaign, at one stage taking over temporary command of the division itself. After the war he served as Quartermaster General of the New Zealand Military Forces. He finished his military career in command of the Southern Military District. After his retirement in 1952, he lived in Christchurch. In his later years he was involved with the St. John Ambulance Association. He died in 1979 at the age of 82.

== Early life ==
Parkinson was born on 5 November 1896 in the Wellington suburb of Mount Cook. His parents were Henry Parkinson, a school teacher, and Ethel Constance Young. Parkinson was schooled at Greytown School and Newtown District High School. He also attended Wellington College for the final two years of his education. In 1913, he sat and passed the entrance examination for the Royal Military College, Duntroon, in Australia, which set aside a limited number of enrolments for New Zealanders. He entered Duntroon the following year and graduated in April 1916.

== Military career ==
Commissioned as a lieutenant in the Royal New Zealand Artillery, Parkinson was posted to Trentham Military Camp where he was an instructor. Nearly a year later, in June 1917, he joined the New Zealand Expeditionary Force and embarked for the Western Front. He acquitted himself well in his duties with the New Zealand Field Artillery (NZFA) and became known as a reliable officer. By the end of the war, he was brigade major of the NZFA. He returned to New Zealand in 1919 and took up a posting as adjutant to the Wellington Garrison Artillery Division.

In 1920, Parkinson was part of the Fiji Expeditionary Force. This was raised following a request from the Fijian government for military forces to support local police dealing with striking labourers and farmers. The force, numbering about 55 men and under the command of the then Major Edward Puttick, was based on Fiji for two months before returning home. Promoted to captain the following year, he spent two years in Dunedin instructing the Territorial Force artillery, before being posted to Auckland. There, he was in charge of harbour defences. In 1925, he was sent to a gunnery course in England and, for the following two years, was seconded to the Royal Artillery. He returned to New Zealand in 1927, accompanied by his wife Barbara Waiohine Howe, who he had married in Birmingham on 30 August the previous year. A series of staff and instructional postings in Wellington, and then Auckland, followed. He was promoted to major in 1932.

In 1937, Parkinson was made commander of the Royal New Zealand Artillery, having been made a temporary lieutenant colonel. He was demoted to major the following year; this reduction in rank was as a result of disciplinary action after using the workshop facilities at Trentham Military Camp for personal work. In 1939, he was returned to his temporary rank of lieutenant colonel. A lot of his work as commander of the artillery involved the implementing programs for the upskilling of gunners and non-commissioned officers to perform leadership roles normally the preserve of officers. Likewise, officers were expected to learn basic gunnery tasks.

=== Second World War ===
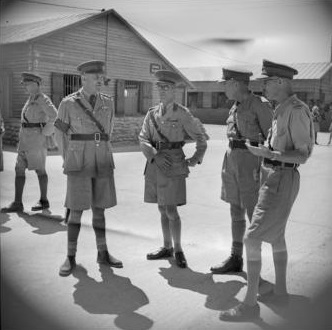
Brigadier Reginald Miles (left front, with arm band), Harold Barrowclough (centre) and Graham Parkinson (2nd right) await a medal ceremony, Maadi, Egypt. Major General Bernard Freyberg is at the extreme left.

Following the outbreak of the Second World War, Parkinson's rank was made substantive and was later seconded to the Second New Zealand Expeditionary Force (2NZEF). He was given command of the 4th Field Artillery Regiment and embarked with the First Echelon of the 2NZEF in early 1940. After serving in the initial stages of the Western Desert campaign, for which he was mentioned in despatches, he led the regiment well during the Battle of Greece. He was later awarded the Distinguished Service Order (DSO), gazetted on 14 April 1942, due in part to his service during the battle.

In late 1941, Parkinson, newly promoted to brigadier, returned to New Zealand to take over the recently formed 1st New Zealand Army Tank Brigade. After Japan's entry into the war, he became commander of the 7th Infantry Brigade, the army reserve in New Zealand, for several months before reverting to his previous command. The tank brigade was eventually disbanded when the 4th Infantry Brigade, based in Egypt, was converted to armour. Parkinson returned to the Middle East and took over command of the 6th Infantry Brigade. He led the brigade during the final stages of the war in North Africa before taking it to the Italian front.

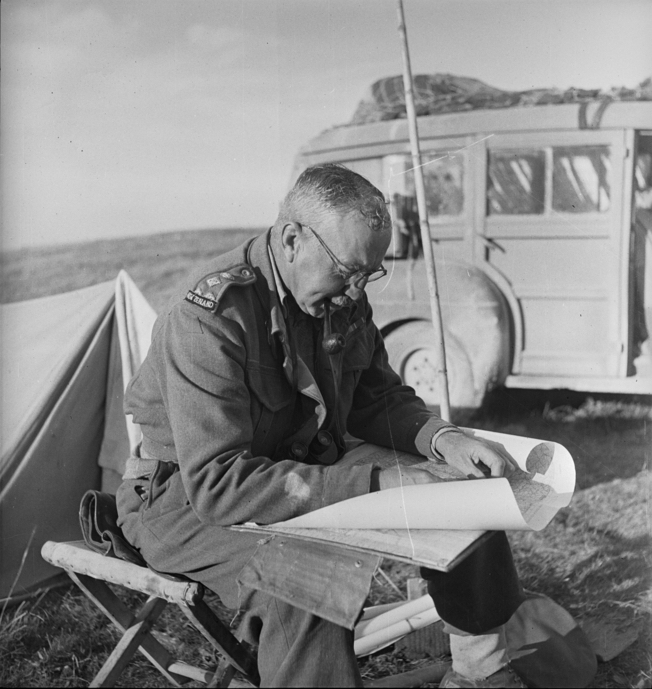
Brigadier Graham Parkinson studies his map a few miles behind the lines of the Italian battlefront, November 1943.

In early March 1944, Parkinson became temporary major general and commander of the 2nd New Zealand Division after its nominal commander, Howard Kippenberger, (Note: In February, Kippenberger was given command of the 2nd New Zealand Division while its regular commander, Lieutenant General Sir Bernard Freyberg, was in charge of the New Zealand Corps, newly formed for the Battle of Monte Cassino.) was wounded. At the time, the New Zealanders, as part of the New Zealand Corps, were participating in the Battle of Monte Cassino. An offensive, largely planned by Kippenberger and involving the division, began on 15 March. Parkinson, already doubting the chances of a successful outcome, failed to follow Kippenberger's directions for dispersion of his troops and did not allow sufficient infantry to enter Monte Cassino immediately following an intensive air bombardment. Although later criticised for being overly cautious during the battle, he was awarded a bar to his DSO for his leadership during this time.

After Monte Cassino and the return of Freyberg to command of the 2nd New Zealand Division, Parkinson went back to lead the 6th Infantry Brigade. From June to August 1944, he was appointed Commander, Royal Artillery, of the division's artillery, replacing Brigadier Stephen Weir, before returning to 6th Infantry Brigade. His brigade performed well in the later stages of the Italian Campaign. For his services during the fighting in Italy, he was appointed Commander of the Order of the British Empire and was also made an Officer of the United States Legion of Merit.

== Later life ==
After a period in command of all 2NZEF troops in Egypt, Parkinson returned to New Zealand in late 1945 and was appointed Quartermaster General of the New Zealand Military Forces, based in Wellington. After serving in this capacity for nearly a year, he was posted to London for a three-year term as the New Zealand military liaison officer. In 1949, he took up command of the Southern Military District. He retired from the military in 1952 with the rank of major general.

In his later years, Parkinson lived in Christchurch and was involved with the St John Ambulance Association for which he was appointed an Officer of the Order of St. John. He died on 10 July 1979, survived by his wife. The couple had no children. He is buried at Ruru Lawn Cemetery in Christchurch.

== Notes ==
Footnotes

Citations
