= 1st New Zealand Army Tank Brigade =

WW2 New Zealand Army unit

- Active: 1941–1942
- Country: New Zealand
- Branch: New Zealand Military Forces
- Type: Armoured warfare
- Size: 3 Battalions

Commanders
- Notable commanders: Graham Beresford Parkinson

Insignia

The 1st New Zealand Army Tank Brigade was an armoured unit of the New Zealand Army during World War II. The brigade was formed in New Zealand during 1941 to provide the 2nd New Zealand Division with armoured support in North Africa. The outbreak of the Pacific War led to it being retained in New Zealand. The 1st Army Tank Brigade was disbanded in 1942, with most of its personnel being used to establish the 4th New Zealand Armoured Brigade in Egypt.

== History ==
The commander of the Second New Zealand Expeditionary Force, Major-General Bernard Freyberg, proposed to the New Zealand Government in October 1940 that an armoured brigade be formed to reinforce the 2nd New Zealand Division. The New Zealand Government rapidly agreed to this in principle. However, the British Government considered that it would be premature to establish such a formation, and it should be regarded as a long-term goal for New Zealand given shortages of tanks and the time needed to train armoured vehicle crews. After further consideration, the New Zealand Cabinet formally approved the establishment of an army tank brigade on 31 July 1941.

The 1st New Zealand Army Tank Brigade was formed at Waiouru Military Camp on 16 October 1941. At this time, it was intended for the brigade to undertake training in New Zealand before departing for the Middle East in March 1942. The first tanks for the brigade, 30 Valentine tanks, arrived in New Zealand during October 1941. Brigadier Graham Beresford Parkinson was selected as the brigade's commander, and arrived in New Zealand during November 1941 after returning from Egypt.

At the time of the outbreak of the Pacific War in December 1941, the full complement of tanks for the brigade still hadn't arrived in New Zealand. Those that had arrived sufficed to allow training to begin, but were inadequate in number to equip the brigade's three tank battalions. The threat of invasion led the tanks to be concentrated in a special battalion. The remainder of the brigade was organised as an infantry brigade with three battalions and practised countering Japanese landings. Parkinson commanded the 7th Brigade from December 1941 to April 1942, when he returned to the tank brigade. In March 1942 it was decided to retain the brigade in New Zealand until at least July that year.

In early 1942 the 3rd Tank Battalion began training with the available tanks. When further tanks arrived they were assigned to the 1st and 2nd Tank Battalions. By August 1942 there were 120 Valentine tanks and 24 M3 Stuarts in New Zealand.

In August 1942 Freyberg requested that the 1st New Zealand Army Tank Brigade be transferred to the Middle East. In his message to the New Zealand Government, he noted that the 2nd New Zealand Division had suffered heavy casualties from German and Italian tanks and "we have felt keenly the lack of our own armoured component". After further consideration, it was decided instead to use the brigade's personnel to convert the 2nd New Zealand Division's 4th Infantry Brigade to the 4th New Zealand Armoured Brigade. This was approved by the New Zealand Government in early September, with the 3rd Tank Battalion being selected as the first unit to be dispatched to the Middle East for that purpose. The 3rd Tank Battalion departed New Zealand on 12 December 1942 and was disbanded upon its arrival in the Middle East so that its members could be posted to the 4th New Zealand Armoured Brigade's constituent formations.

Following the decision to use it to reinforce the 4th New Zealand Armoured Brigade, the 1st New Zealand Army Tank Brigade was disbanded in late 1942. The 1st Tank Battalion was used for home defence purposes until it was disbanded in June 1943, with most of its personnel being posted to the Middle East. The 270-man strong 3rd Division Tank Squadron was formed from the 2nd Tank Battalion, and served in the Pacific with the 3rd New Zealand Division. Most of the 2nd Tank Battalion's other personnel were sent to the Middle East.

== See also ==
- Tanks of New Zealand
