= 4th New Zealand Armoured Brigade =

WW2 New Zealand Army formation

- Active: 1942–45; 1953–60
- Country: New Zealand
- Branch: New Zealand Military Forces
- Type: Armoured
- Size: Brigade
- Part of: 2nd New Zealand Division
- Engagements: The Sangro; Battle of Monte Cassino; Central Italy; Adriatic Coast

Commanders
- Notable commanders: Lindsay Inglis; Keith Stewart

Insignia
- Identification symbol: New Zealand Fern

The 4th New Zealand Armoured Brigade was an armoured brigade of the New Zealand Military Forces, formed during the Second World War in October 1942 from the remnants of the 4th New Zealand Infantry Brigade. It was part of the 2nd New Zealand Division, which had already seen action in the Battle of Greece, the Battle of Crete and in the North African Campaign, having a leading part in the Second Battle of El Alamein. The brigade arrived in Italy in October 1943 and took part in a number of battles over the course of a sixteen-month campaign in Italy. They were equipped with Sherman and Stuart tanks, Lynx scout cars and a variety of other vehicles. The 4th Armoured Brigade was officially disbanded, after the war, in December 1945. It was reactivated briefly in the 1950s.

== History ==
=== Formation ===
The 4th New Zealand Armoured Brigade, commanded by Brigadier Lindsay Inglis, came into being on 5 October 1942 after the 4th New Zealand Infantry Brigade was converted into an armoured brigade. Upon formation the 4th New Zealand Armoured Brigade was initially composed only of one regiment, the 19th Armoured Regiment. Many of the 4th Armoured Brigade's personnel were drawn from the 1st New Zealand Army Tank Brigade. This brigade had been formed in New Zealand to provide armoured support for the 2nd New Zealand Division and was disbanded when a decision was made to convert the 4th Brigade.

By the time it deployed to Italy in October 1943, the brigade included the 18th and 20th armoured regiments, and the 22nd Motorised Battalion, which included an anti-tank company.

The armoured regiments were organized along British lines, albeit with fewer tanks than their British counterparts. A New Zealand armoured regiment consisted of 52 Sherman tanks. These composed a Regimental HQ troop of four tanks and three squadrons of 16 tanks. In addition the regiment contained a Recce Troop equipped with Stuart V light tanks in both turreted and turret less configurations and an Intercommunication troop equipped with Lynx light scout cars. Each Squadron consisted of a Squadron Headquarters with four tanks and four troops each of three tanks.

=== Battles ===
- The Sangro (October–December 1943)
- Battle of Monte Cassino (February–March 1944)
- Central Italy (May–December 1944)
- Adriatic Coast (April–May 1945).

=== Italian Campaign ===
The brigade arrived in Italy on 5 October 1943, over a month after the initial invasion, landing at Taranto and were involved in the first actions to break through the Bernhardt Line on the Sangro front.

The Sangro Front, 1943.

In 1944 they were transferred to U.S. Fifth Army on the Italian western coast. The New Zealand Division was joined by the 4th Indian Division and the British 78th Division, and together with units of the U.S. 1st Armored Division formed the New Zealand Corps and was tasked with the capture of the town of Cassino, its skyline dominated by a 13th Century Monastery. During this period the 4th New Zealand Armoured Brigade was tasked with supporting the infantry. Individual squadrons were employed in a fire support role, often being used as makeshift artillery. The 20th Armoured Regiment participated in a flanking attack, approaching the Monastery on a specially constructed road from behind. Surprise was achieved, but insufficient infantry reserves to press the initiative saw the German defenders regain the upper hand and the tanks fell back.

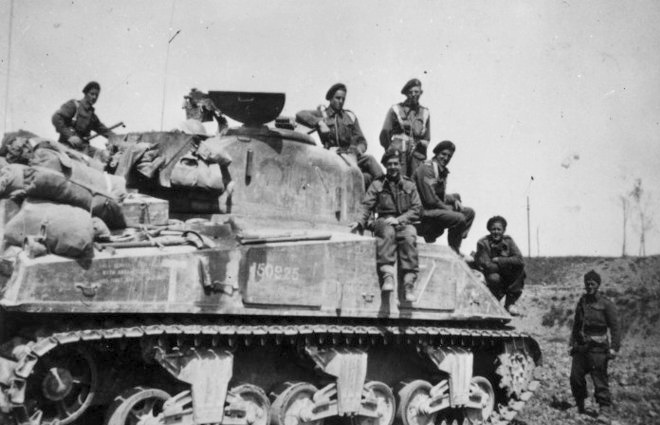
Soldiers of the 18th Armoured Regiment, with a Sherman ready to cross the Po River in Italy.

In March tanks from the 19th Armoured Regiment entered the town proper to support members of the 28th Māori Battalion in the bitter house to house fighting, using their 75 mm guns to dig the defenders out of strong points. The degree of rubble clogging the streets made progress slow and by the end of the month when relieved by the 20th Armoured Regiment the Shermans had reverted to the role of static fire support.

This continued for the next two months, with the tanks able to provide little more than morale support to the infantry until the monastery finally fell to Polish forces on 19 May 1944.

In June, the 22nd Battalion was reorganised as a motorised infantry battalion, with three companies of infantry, plus a support company. Its anti-tank company was significantly reduced. Four months later, as part of an overhaul of the 2nd New Zealand Division designed to increase its infantry strength, it was converted to a conventional infantry battalion and transferred to the 5th Infantry Brigade.

In August the 18th Armoured Regiment during an attack on Castelle, were employed as gun tows for 6pdr and 17pdr guns, the guns crews being carried as tank riders. The brigade's next major engagement was to assist in the British Eighth Army's attack on the Adriatic end of the Gothic Line in September 1944.

The final campaign began on 9 April 1945 with some New Zealand armoured units again being used as artillery support. A number of rivers blocked the advance and these were progressively assaulted by infantry and then in turn the armour moved up to support as bridges were constructed. By this point the German troops had begun surrendering in large numbers.

With the final rivers behind them the bulk of the New Zealand armoured brigade raced to the city of Trieste where they accepted the surrender of the German garrison. Members of Josip Broz Tito's Yugoslav partisan army had also occupied the city and the presence of the New Zealanders in an area the Yugoslavs considered their spoils of war was not welcome. Tensions remained high, at one point escalating to a face off between 25 Yugoslav T-34s, which had entered the city, and the 19th Armoured Regiment.

After the end of hostilities in Europe, the 4th New Zealand Armoured Brigade remained as a garrison force in Trieste for a month before surrendering most of their equipment to a British depot. Nevertheless, the brigade retained approximately 100 vehicles to form the core of an armoured force for future deployment to the Pacific theatre to conduct operations against the Japanese. However, with the war in the Pacific also drawing to a close these tanks were later retired and on 2 December 1945 the 4th New Zealand Armoured Brigade was officially disbanded.

=== Reactivation ===
The brigade was reformed in April 1953 to supervise the four Territorial Force armoured regiments of the New Zealand Division, which was designated for a war role against a Soviet invasion of the Middle East. Headquarters was located at Linton Military Camp in what was then the Central Military District.

The 2nd and 3rd Armoured Regiments were suspended, effectively disbanded, in 1956. However, in 1958 the 2nd Armoured Regiment was reactivated on 15 September 1958 as a Regular Force unit. It was then redesignated Queen Alexandra's Armoured Regiment and then The Queen Alexandra's Regiment RNZAC on 31 August 1959. In 1956, the Divisional Regiment, RNZAC, was redesignated 4th Armoured Regiment.

The date the 4th Armoured Brigade was disestablished is not immediately clear, but on 1 June 1960 the 4th New Zealand Infantry Brigade Group was established to supervise Regular Force units.
