= 4th Infantry Brigade (New Zealand) =

- Active: 1917–18; 1939–42
- Country: New Zealand
- Branch: New Zealand Military Forces
- Type: Infantry
- Size: Brigade
- Part of: New Zealand Division (1917–18); 2nd New Zealand Division (1939–42)
- Engagements: First World War: Battle of Broodseinde; Second World War: Battle of Greece; Battle of Crete; North African campaign

Commanders
- Notable commanders: Herbert Ernest Hart; Edward Puttick

The 4th Infantry Brigade was a formation of the New Zealand Military Forces, active in both the First and Second World Wars. It was initially raised in England in 1917 for service with the New Zealand Division on the Western Front during the First World War. It only fought in one major engagement, the Battle of Broodseinde, although it was in reserve for two other significant battles, the Battle of Messines and the First Battle of Passchendaele. The brigade was disbanded in early 1918 due to a reorganisation of the New Zealand Division.

The brigade was resurrected for service in the Second World War as part of the 2nd New Zealand Division. It saw service during the Battle of Greece, the Battle of Crete and the North African campaign before being converted into the 4th New Zealand Armoured Brigade.

== First World War ==
=== Formation ===
The 4th Infantry Brigade was formed in response to a request made by the British War Office in February 1917 for a second New Zealand division, or failing that, additional infantry brigades. This request was not particularly well received by sections of the New Zealand Government, which already felt its contributions to the war effort were not being fully recognised by the British. Despite this, New Zealand's prime minister, William Massey, supported the request. Consequently, a decision was made to form an additional brigade for service with the New Zealand Division from troops already in England. However, Massey did place a caveat on the brigade in that no additional reinforcements would be sent to maintain it, and if required, it could be used to supply replacements for the New Zealand Division.

Lieutenant General Sir Alexander Godley, the commander of the New Zealand Expeditionary Force (NZEF), had put in place an excellent support structure to ensure the manpower needs of the NZEF was well supplied. By this stage of the war, approximately 2,200 men were arriving at the NZEF's bases in England every month from New Zealand. This, together with the fact that the New Zealand Division had incurred relatively few losses since the Battle of the Somme the previous year, meant that there was a reserve of around 10,000 men available with which to draw upon for the new brigade without adversely affecting the ability to replace existing troops in the field, in the short-term at least.

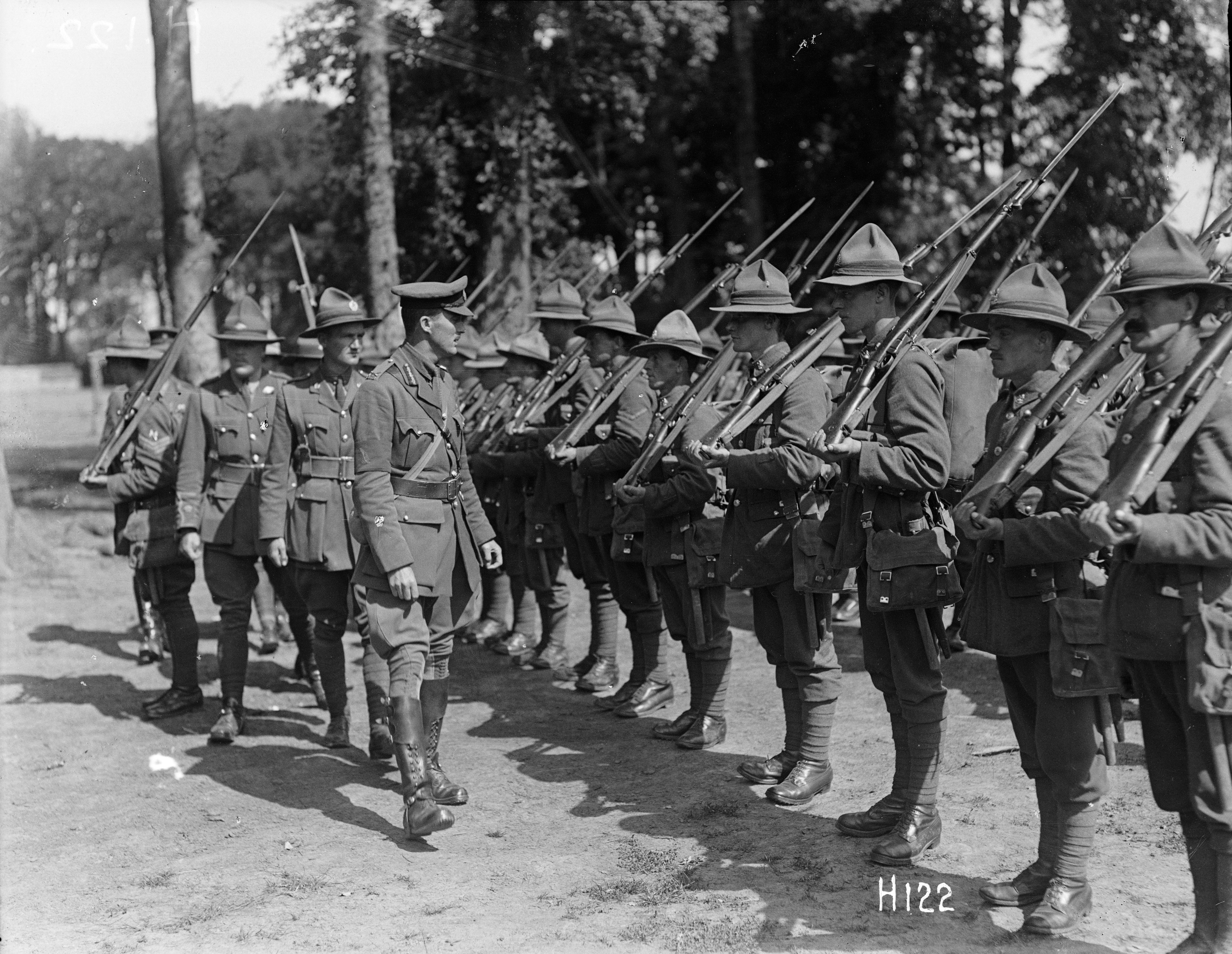
Brigadier General Hart inspecting men of 4th Brigade, 6 July 1917

Thus, the 4th Infantry Brigade was officially formed on 15 March 1917 at Codford, the command depot of the NZEF. Its core units were four infantry battalions specifically formed for the brigade, these being the third battalions of the Auckland, Wellington, Canterbury and Otago regiments (the first and second battalions of each regiment were serving with the 1st Infantry Brigade and 2nd Infantry Brigades respectively). Its men were drawn from fresh replacements newly arrived in England, men recovered from wounds and already at Codford and finally, experienced men specifically sent from France.

Godley appointed newly promoted Brigadier General Herbert Ernest Hart as the commander of the brigade. Hart was an experienced soldier, having served at both Gallipoli and the Western Front as a battalion commander, and immediately implemented a rigorous training programme for his troops. However, he had to curtail the training programme when he received orders to embark for France, which the brigade duly did on 29 May 1917.

=== Western Front ===
Initially the brigade came under the command of II Anzac Corps, to which the New Zealand Division was attached, and was based at Bailleul. The bulk of the brigade was held in reserve for the Battle of Messines, but some specialist troops supported the Allied attack on the Messines Ridge. The infantry also provided road working parties. The brigade then came under the direct tactical command of the New Zealand Division on 10 June.

It was initially tasked with holding a quiet section of the frontlines near Messines, and conducted limited offensive actions in order to tie up German manpower in the area. It remained in the sector until late August 1917, before it was relieved and withdrawn, along with the 1st and 2nd Infantry Brigades, to a training area. This allowed Hart to continue training of his relatively new brigade, although he was satisfied with its performance to date.

==== Battle of Broodseinde ====
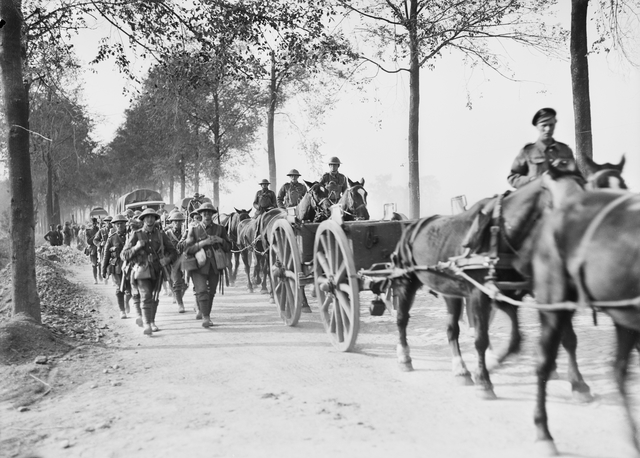
New Zealand infantry marching up to the Ypres sector in anticipation of the attack on Gravenstafel Spur, September 1917.

In late September, II Anzac Corps was detailed for the ongoing Battle of Passchendaele, also known as the Third Battle of Ypres. The New Zealand Division was to launch an attack on Gravenstafel Spur, running off the Passchendaele Ridge, as part of what would become known as the Battle of Broodseinde. The attack was part of an overall strategy to capture the ridges running in front of Passchendaele, prior to an attack on the village itself.

The division's section of the frontline was approximately 2,000 metres, with the 4th Brigade moving into the southern portion of the line on 2 October. On its right was the Australian 3rd Division, while on its left flank was the 1st Brigade. The British 48th Division (of XVIII Corps) was to the left of the 1st Brigade. Together with the 1st Infantry Brigade, the 4th Brigade was tasked with two objectives, the 'Red Line' and the 'Blue Line'. The line of advance for the 4th Brigade included the Abraham Heights. Two battalions from each brigade (the Auckland and Otago battalions in the case of the 4th Brigade) were to advance to and secure the 'Red Line', running along the crest of the ridge. The other two battalions (the Canterbury and Wellington battalions) of the respective brigades would then advance through the 'Red Line' to take the 'Blue Line', at the bottom of the Belluvue Spur.

On 4 October, preceded by an artillery barrage beginning at 06:00, the division began its offensive with the infantry of 4 Brigade advancing behind a creeping barrage. This barrage caught massed German troops, preparing for their own attack, out in the open. The German infantry, decimated by the artillery fire, were swiftly dealt with by the advancing New Zealanders. Despite the presence of pillboxes, the 'Red Line' objective was reached on schedule, with some limited mopping up operations conducted forward of the line by parties of the Auckland and Otago battalions. Having moved up to the 'Red Line' behind the attacking forces, at 08:10, the Canterbury and Wellington battalions began moving forward to the 'Blue Line'. Despite some resistance from machine gun nests and pockets of infantry sheltering in shell holes, the 'Blue Line' objective was reached by 4 Brigade at 09:30. The infantry of 1st Brigade reached the line at about the same time. Rain began to fall later that afternoon, and quickly began turning the ground boggy. Despite this, for the next two days, under the protection of heavy artillery support, both brigades consolidated their positions and established trench lines. The Germans mounted some small scale counterattacks but these were easily dealt with. From 5 October, the rain began to set in, making movement of men and equipment to the front line difficult. On 6 October, both brigades were relieved by the 49th Division.

The attack was a success with the brigades taking all their objectives on schedule. The 4th Brigade captured 700 prisoners of war, for the loss of 130 men killed, and over 600 wounded (192 were killed in 1st Brigade, with 700 wounded). From the jump off line, the division had made gains of around 1,000 metres. Both Godley and Major General Russell, the commander of the New Zealand Division, specifically acknowledged the contributions of the 4th Brigade towards the success of the attack.

==== In the line ====
The 4th Brigade was held in reserve for the following Battle of Passchendaele, which involved the New Zealand Division's 2nd and 3rd Brigades attacking Belluvue Spur, while the Australian 3rd Division attempted to take Passchendaele itself. The attack, which commenced on 12 October, proved to be a costly failure with the New Zealand Division suffering heavy losses with over 600 killed and 2000 odd wounded. The 4th Brigade moved up to the line to relieve the 2nd and 3rd Brigades, and would remain there until the division was relieved and withdrawn to a training area in late October.

In November, the brigade returned to the Ypres sector to man the lines vacated by the 110th Brigade of British 21st Division along the Broodseinde Ridge, which included Polygon Wood. Regular patrols were run into No-Man's Land and minor skirmishes occurred up and down the brigade's positions. It was eventually relieved in the line by 1st Brigade in early January 1918.

=== Disbandment ===
Political considerations were coming to bear on the existence of 4th Brigade. In New Zealand, there was still lingering resentment at the manpower demands being placed upon the country, compared to those made on Australia and Canada. Furthermore, while New Zealand was considering conscription of married men (single men already being conscripted), Australia's reliance on volunteers only rankled, particularly as the British reduced their manpower demands on Australia without informing the New Zealand Government. Consequently, the New Zealand Government wanted a reduction in reinforcements being sent to the Western Front, yet the New Zealand Division, following the losses during the Battle of Passchendaele, also needed to restore its complement of men. Thus, an existing brigade needed to be broken up to supply the necessary reinforcements.

New Zealand's prime minister, Massey, had previously stipulated the 4th Brigade would supply any necessary reinforcements to the division but Major General Russell favoured disbandment of the 3rd Brigade over the 4th Brigade. The 3rd had been shattered by the attack on Belluvue Spur the previous October, while Russell considered the 4th to be the best brigade in his division. However, the commandant of the New Zealand Military Forces, Major General Sir Alfred Robin, who was among those who had never supported the formation of the additional brigade, wanted 4th Brigade broken up instead.

Accordingly, Hart was informed in January 1918 that the 4th Brigade was to be disbanded, with the 3rd Otago and Canterbury battalions going to 2nd Brigade (with Hart taking over as commander of the brigade). Many of the remaining troops formed the basis of the newly formed New Zealand Entrenching Group, which comprised three battalions, one for each of the remaining brigades of the New Zealand Division. The group effectively served as a reinforcement pool for the division. The 4th Brigade was officially disbanded on 7 February 1918.

== Second World War ==
Shortly after the outbreak of the Second World War on 3 September 1939, the New Zealand government authorised the formation of a 'Special Force', what would later be designed the Second New Zealand Expeditionary Force, of 6,600 men for service overseas. After consultation with the British government, it was decided that New Zealand's primary contribution to the war effort would be in the form of an infantry division.

=== Formation ===
The 4th Infantry Brigade (Note: The brigade was designated as such for consistency with the numbering of the three existing infantry brigades of the Territorial Force.) was the first of the three echelons to be raised for the 2nd New Zealand Division and it began assembling in early October 1939. It consisted of three infantry battalions, including the 18th (with men drawn from the Auckland Military District), the 19th (Central Military District), and the 20th (South Island Military District). (Note: Like the numbering of the brigades, the battalion designations were for consistency with the existing 17 infantry battalions of the Territorial Force.) The brigade commander was Brigadier Edward Puttick, a professional soldier in the New Zealand Military Forces, who had led a rifle battalion in the First World War.

=== Greece ===
The start of the Greek campaign marked the division's first offensive operations as a complete formation. Sent to Greece alongside the Australian 6th Division and the 1st British armoured brigade in order to support the Greeks in their defence against an expected invasion by the Germans, the New Zealanders manned the Aliakmon Line, with the 4th Brigade deployed on the western end of the line, inland of the coast. Arriving in early March, it busied itself with preparation of its defensive positions for the next several days. For a time, the 19th Battalion was detached to help prepare defensive positions for the 5th Brigade, still in transit, around Olympus Pass.

The Germans began their invasion of Greece on 6 April and within a few days, the Aliakmon Line was abandoned with the brigade being redeployed to Servia Pass following the collapse of the Yugoslav Third Army in neighbouring Yugoslavia. Once established in its new positions, the brigade came under air attack and suffered artillery barrages as the Germans advanced. The 18th Battalion also fended off initial probing attacks by elements of the 9th Panzer Division but were unable to prevent the Germans from occupying Servia. However, they were withdrawn on 13 April to the Thermopylae Line, a new defensive position 140 kilometres (87 mi) to the south, due to pressure on their flanks. Here, the line was held by the 2nd New Zealand Division and 6th Australian Division; the 4th Brigade was held in reserve while the 5th and 6th Brigades manned the front lines. However, on 22 April, the Allies decided to abandon Greece and the brigade made its way to Porto Rafti, east of Athens, from where it was evacuated to Crete.

=== Crete ===
On Crete, the 4th Brigade was stationed as a reserve force in the area around Galatas.

The 4th Brigade was evacuated from Sfakia on 30–31 May, with the 18th Battalion forming a rearguard helping police and maintain order; it was the last battalion of the brigade taken off.

=== North Africa ===
The 2nd New Zealand Division began preparing for a role in the upcoming Libyan offensive, and several divisional and brigade level exercises were carried out.

In June 1942, Gray, the commander of 18th Battalion, was promoted to brigadier and given command of the 4th Brigade. He was killed in an air raid shortly afterwards. From late June to early July, the entire division relocated several times. During this time, 18th Battalion was detached from the brigade to serve as security for the divisional headquarters. On the evening of 14 July, the brigade, with 18th Battalion, back as part of its order of battle, was part of the attack on Ruweisat Ridge, held by the enemy. The attack was a success with all three of its battalions on the ridge by daybreak the next day. A German counterattack that afternoon of 15 July overwhelmed the 19th and 20th Battalions, and caused heavy losses amongst the 18th Battalion. Following the effective destruction of the 19th and 20th Battalions, the 18th Battalion remained in the field attached to the 5th Brigade. It then supported an attack by the 6th Brigade on El Mreir. Inadequately supported by armour, the attack proved a failure although the battalion escaped with relatively few casualties. It remained in the line throughout August and into September at which time, having been reduced to just 350 personnel, it was withdrawn to Maadi to rejoin the reconstituted 4th Brigade.

=== Conversion to armour ===
It had previously been decided to form an armoured brigade to provide tank support to the 2nd New Zealand Division and as a result, the 1st New Zealand Army Tank Brigade was formed. This brigade was still undergoing training in New Zealand in September when it was decided to convert the 4th Brigade to armour instead. Personnel were transferred from the tank brigade in New Zealand to bring the 4th Brigade back up to strength and it was formally designated the 4th Armoured Brigade in October 1942.

== Notes ==
Footnotes

Citations
