= Battle of 42nd Street =

World War II battle on the island of Crete, Greece

Coordinates: 35.4819°N 24.0559°E

- Part of the Battle of Crete of World War II
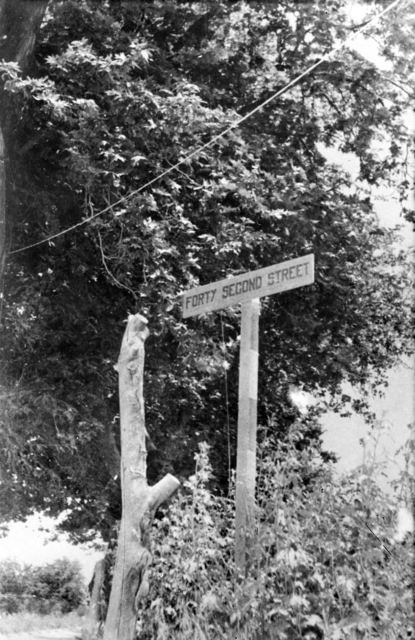
- Forty-Second street sign.
Date	27 May 1941
Location	South-east of Chania, Crete
Result	Allied victory

Belligerents
Australia; New Zealand; Greece	(Nazi Germany) Germany

Commanders and leaders
	(Nazi Germany) Hans Forster

Units involved
2/7th Battalion; 2/8th Battalion; 2/1st Machine Gun Battalion; 19th Battalion; 21st Battalion; 22nd Battalion; 23rd Battalion; 28th (Maori) Battalion; A few Greek soldiers	(Nazi Germany) 1st Battalion of the 141st Gebirgsjäger Regiment (Nazi Germany) Small groups of paratroopers

Strength
8 infantry battalions plus a few Greek soldiers	400–500 men

Casualties and losses
Estimated 52 killed and wounded	Estimated 280 killed, 3 captured

The Battle of 42nd Street was fought between Australian and New Zealand (Anzac) forces and German troops on the island of Crete on 27 May 1941, during World War II. The location took its name from a sunken dirt road south-east of Chania, unofficially named 42nd Street by British troops after the 42nd Field Company, Royal Engineers, who had been stationed there. On 20 May, Germany launched a combined airborne and amphibious invasion of Crete. A week later, after the British and Commonwealth forces defending the island were forced to withdraw towards Chania, a force of several understrength Australian and New Zealand infantry battalions established a defensive line along 42nd Street, south-east of Chania, forming a rearguard for the withdrawing troops.

On 27 May, as a German battalion advanced towards 42nd Street, the Anzac defenders carried out a bayonet charge that inflicted heavy casualties on the German attackers, which forced them to withdraw and briefly halted the German advance. Afterwards, the Anzac troops kept retreating towards the southern coast of the island.

== Background ==
Greece became a belligerent in World War II when it was invaded by Italy on 28 October 1940. A British and Commonwealth expeditionary force was offered to support the Greeks, but they did not immediately accept the offer, and personnel did not begin to arrive until 4 March the following year. This force eventually totalled more than 60,000 troops. British forces also garrisoned Crete, enabling the Greek Fifth Cretan Division to reinforce the mainland campaign instead of defending Crete. This arrangement suited the British as Crete could provide the Royal Navy with harbours on its north coast. The Italians were repulsed by the Greeks without the aid of the expeditionary force. In April 1941, six months after the failed Italian invasion, a German attack overran mainland Greece and the expeditionary force was withdrawn. By the end of April, over 50,000 Allied personnel were evacuated by the Royal Navy. Some were sent to Crete to bolster its garrison, though most had lost their heavy equipment.

== Opposing forces ==
Map of the German assault on Crete; 42nd is to the west (left) near Souda Bay

=== Allied forces ===
After departing from Alexandria in Egypt, British personnel began arriving on Crete on 1 November 1940. They then began Operation Scorcher, the operation covering the defence of Crete. British Prime Minister Winston Churchill ordered three new airfields to be created on Crete, and they were ready by February 1941, as were additional coastal defense guns and anti-aircraft units. Using the Ultra decryption system, which included the Enigma machine, the British discovered the German plan to invade Crete on 26 April. Prior to the Battle of Crete, Axis victories in Greece provided the Germans with a semi-circle of aerodromes, the closest situated just 60 miles (97 km) north of the island. These gave them air supremacy over the island, as their airplanes could operate from nearby, whilst the nearest British airbases were in Alexandria, 400 miles (640 km) away, with aircraft coming from there nearing the limit of their range. The Royal Navy could thus not successfully operate around Crete except for fast ships operating in the dark once the Germans had gained aerial supremacy.

On 29 April 1941, Major-General Bernard Freyberg, who had been evacuated from mainland Greece with the 2nd New Zealand Division on HMS Ajax, arrived at Crete. He was appointed commander-in-chief of the island the next day by General Archibald Wavell. Freyberg noted the acute lack of heavy weapons, equipment, supplies and communication facilities. Equipment was scarce in the Mediterranean, particularly in the isolated areas of Crete. The British forces on Crete had seven commanders in seven months. By early April, airfields at Maleme and Heraklion and the landing strip at Rethymno, all on the north coast, were ready and another strip at Pediada-Kastelli was nearly finished.

Of the airstrips on Crete, the only one with a concrete runway was at Heraklion. A radar station was established on Ames Ridge, a hill south-east of Heraklion airfield, but it was outside the defensive perimeter and its communications were unreliable. By 29 April, the Commonwealth troops of the defeated Allied expeditionary force were evacuated from mainland Greece. In the space of a week, 27,000 of these personnel arrived on Crete from Greece; many lacked any equipment other than their personal weapons, and some lacked even those. Of these, 9,000 were further evacuated and 18,000 remained on Crete when the battle commenced. With the pre-existing garrison of 14,000, this gave the Allies a total of 32,000 Commonwealth personnel to face the German attack, supplemented by 10,000 Greeks.

On 6 May, Freyberg received a message called "Secret and Most Immediate" from the Middle East Command Headquarters saying the Germans would attack on 17 May, the Ultra system then updated him on the date, first moving it to the 19th and then to the 20th. Using the information gathered from Ultra, he split his forces into four semi-independent sectors. The four sectors were: Chania and Souda Bay with 15,227 personnel, Maleme with 11,859, Central with 6,730, and Heraklion with 8,024 defenders. The British originally had aircraft defending the island. However, by 19 May, the Luftwaffe had destroyed all but seven fighter aircraft, which were ordered to return to Egypt for safety. The forces in the battle on the Allied side were the Australian 2/7th, 2/8th, and 2/1st Machine Gun Battalions, and New Zealand's 21st, 28th (Maori), 19th, 22nd and 23rd Battalions. A few Greek soldiers were involved as well. The troops were positioned parallel to the north-south 42nd Street, with the 2/8th situated furthest north followed sequentially down the road by the 2/7th, 21st, 28th, 19th, with the 23rd being positioned behind the 19th and 22nd in reserve.

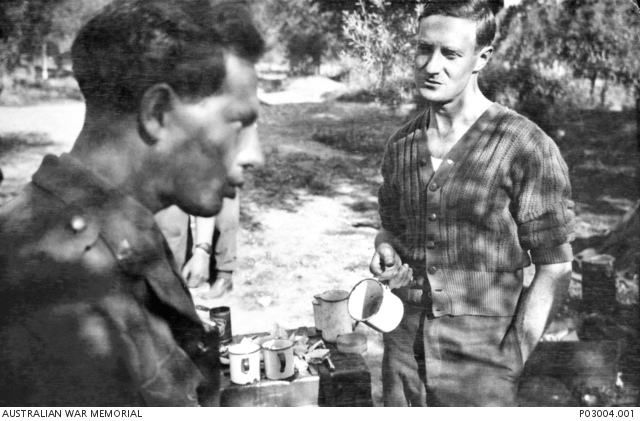
Damien Parer (left) and Ron Williams stopped for a tea break on 42nd Street in Suda Bay

=== Axis forces ===
The German assault on Crete was code-named "Operation Mercury" (Unternehmen Merkur). It was ordered on 25 April 1941 by Dictator of Germany Adolf Hitler's Directive 28, despite the Germans not knowing the Allied forces and underestimating them at 5,000 personnel. The directive also stated the operation was to take place in May and must not interfere with the planned campaign against the Soviet Union. The attack plan was to have three parts, Group West focusing on Maleme airfield, Group Central on Chania, Souda Bay, and Rethymno airfields, and Group East on the airfield of Heraklion. It was controlled by the XII Army and commanded by Field Marshal Wilhelm List. The German VIII Air Corps (VIII Fliegerkorps) provided close air support; it was equipped with 570 combat aircraft. The infantry available for the assault were the German 7th Air Division, with the Air-landing Assault Regiment (Luftlande-Sturm-Regiment) attached, and the 5th Mountain Division. They totalled 22,000 soldiers grouped under the XI Air Corps (XI Fliegerkorps) commanded by Lieutenant-general Kurt Student, who was in operational control of the attack. Over 500 Junkers Ju 52 transport aircraft were assembled to carry them. Student planned a series of four parachute assaults against Allied facilities on the north coast of Crete by the 7th Air Division, which would then be reinforced by the 5th Mountain Division, part transported by air and part by sea; the latter would also ferry much of the heavy equipment. Before the invasion, the Germans conducted a bombing campaign to establish air superiority and forced the RAF to evacuate its aircraft and rebase them in Alexandria. A few days before the attack, German intelligence summaries stated that the total Allied force on Crete consisted of 5,000 men. This was increased to 12,000, and as the transports of the 7th Air Division were taxing for take off on the morning of 20 May its officers were given an updated estimate of 48,000 Allied defenders. On 21 May the first landings began, concentrated around four points: Maleme, Chania, Rethymno and Heraklion. The personnel in the battle on the German side were the 1st Battalion of the 141st Mountain Regiment, commanded by Major Hans Forster, and some paratroopers who were left from the original landings.

== Battle ==
During the initial stages of the fighting on Crete, the Australians defending Heraklion managed to defeat the attacking force and the troops at Rethymno were able to blunt the attack, holding it for more than a week. However at Maleme, the Germans managed to wrest control of a vital airfield, and as a result began flying in reinforcements of airborne and mountain troops. As the Germans began moving inland to outflank the defenders' positions, the Australian, New Zealand and British forces were forced back towards the city of Chania, which came under heavy air attack by German bombers. The British Royal Navy kept control of the sea around Crete despite the initial German attack. By 27 May, the weakened Australian 2/7th and 2/8th Battalions, supported by the New Zealand 21st, 28th (Maori), 19th, 22nd and 23rd Battalions, had taken up positions along 42nd Street, south-east of Chania, where they formed a rearguard to protect the rest of the Commonwealth forces being pushed south. The Australian and New Zealand (Anzac) units were manned at less than 50 percent of their normal strength, having suffered heavy casualties earlier in the fighting. The various units believed they were acting as reserves and would be shielded by other Allied forces whilst the Germans attacked. They did not know they were meant to take up defensive positions, as according to Maori soldier Rangi Royal, the troops were not aware they were the first line of defence.

There was an unsealed road that ran from Chania to Tsikalaria, lined with olive trees, and ran south from the main coastal road from Chania to Souda Bay. The road was lower than the surrounding land and was nicknamed 42nd Street, after both the 42nd Field Company of the Royal Engineers, who had previously camped there, and the musical film 42nd Street. (Note: The road was known locally as Tsivalarion Road.) Early on the morning of 27 May, around 0800, Lieutenant-Colonel George Dittmer, commander of the Maori Battalion, called a meeting with Lieutenant-Colonels Theodore Walker of the 2/7th and John Manchester Allen of the 21st and they decided that if the Germans approached their battalions, they would engage them and charge. At this meeting, they also agreed on defensive positions, ordering that all men to the west of the road should be moved onto it or to its east, as that side was more defensible.

At roughly 1100, the 1st Battalion of the 141st Mountain Regiment was seen approaching 42nd Street, roughly 400–500 strong, by the 2/8th. Advancing along the road to Souda, they were estimated by the Australian and New Zealand defenders as numbering about 400, and were attempting to raid an abandoned supply depot under the cover of mortar and machine-gun fire. The 2/7th's Major Walter Miller commanded Lieutenant Beverley McGeoch to lead a 14-strong patrol to observe them, while he planned an attack. McGeoch was not to attack until the Germans had come close enough to be too close to escape a surprise attack. The patrol advanced about 500 metres (550 yd) after draping their helmets with green silk from parachutes to act as camouflage.

Miller then told Captain St Elmo Dudley Nelson to join the attack, and sent a runner to Walker with the same message. At the start of the attack, when McGeoch's patrol was about 450 metres (490 yards) away from the Germans, half of them opened fire on the Axis. Roughly five minutes later, the other half of McGeoch's 14 soldiers opened fire as well. Miller was walking over to the Lieutenant's patrol when the firefight began and sent his C Company forward to join in. One platoon of C Company was placed on each side of McGeoch's patrol to create a line. The Anzacs established superiority of fire after a few minutes. Together, they ended up killing most of the Germans in the area whilst others fled. Then, doing as they were told, D Company of the 2/7th joined the fight after hearing the first shots fired. Nelson was shot in the shoulder advancing with his unit. Lieutenant Stephen Bernard then took over his company, and kept leading even after being injured. He and his company chased the Germans, killing every German in the area who hadn't surrendered or been taken prisoner. Walker ordered the reserve A and B Companies to take the place of the attacking C and D Companies. Miller ordered roughly six bombs to be fired by the Anzac mortar teams, which they did. This caused the few remaining Germans to flee, and they were pursued by Miller's forces. In Charles Moihi Bennett, a Maori officer's account, Greek soldiers could be heard during the charge shouting "Aera" (transl. like the wind).

Down the road, the other units began to charge as well. Prior to the charge, the Maori Battalion was lined up with Frederick Baker's A Company on the right, Royal's B Company leading the charge in the middle, and with the C Company taking up the left. B Company started the charge, and A Company soon followed, with C Company joining in after performing a haka. The Germans fought back until the Maoris advanced some 250 metres (270 yd), then they began to flee. All the other units but the 19th joined the charge, not as entire companies or battalions but as various soldiers from different units joining in groups. The 19th had initially ignored the calls to charge but eventually joined the fighting. However, some soldiers from the 19th did not play a major role and instead watched the Maori's charge, as the bulk of the Germans were in the path of the Maoris not the 19th.

During the charge, some mortar teams tried to fight back but they were overrun and killed. The retreating Germans who tried to hide were bayoneted. The charge resulted in the Germans retreating over 1,500 metres (1,600 yd). The pursuit stopped and Dittmer ordered the Maori Battalion’s second-in-command, George Bertrand to retrieve the rest of the New Zealanders. Some of them were unhappy about having to return to 42nd Street, with one soldier saying "The boys didn't want to stop. Had we let them they would have chased the enemy indefinitely." The Australians were also ordered to return to the road by Walter Miller, commander of the C Company. He did this after he realized his troops had no cover and that they had already pushed the Germans back quite far. On the way back to 42nd Street, many of the Anzacs stopped to pick up rations from the German dead. The Australians reported killing roughly 200 Germans and capturing three, while the New Zealanders reported killing in excess of 80 Germans; 10 Australians from the 2/7th were killed and 28 wounded, while the Maori Battalion suffered a further 14 casualties.

The action halted the German 5th Mountain Division for the remainder of the day. That afternoon, the Anzacs spotted German forces moving across the flanks of the mountains, trying to encircle them. The Anzac troops withdrew, joining the columns retreating south. A short time later, the British high command authorised the evacuation of Crete, ordering a withdrawal across the White Mountains to Sfakia in the south where the troops could be taken off the island by the Royal Navy. The 2/7th subsequently took part in further rearguard actions. Although it had planned to evacuate, it was the last Allied unit to be withdrawn, and the battalion was left behind when the evacuation of Commonwealth troops ceased on 1 June due to heavy losses at sea, including seven destroyers, six cruisers, two battleships, and an aircraft carrier being severely damaged, and six destroyers and three cruisers sunk. Still on Crete, Walker surrendered any Allied troops trapped on Crete, having helped delay the German advance long enough to allow 12,000 others to be withdrawn. The battalion was later rebuilt from the small cadre that managed to avoid capture, and later fought in the Pacific against the Japanese.

== Aftermath ==
After the war, the Germans reported war crimes had been committed by the Anzacs due to the ferocity of the fighting. The dead from 1st Battalion of the 141st Mountain Regiment were later found by the Germans, numbering 121, after being bayoneted and clubbed to death by the Anzacs. In comparison, the 20 Commonwealth dead left behind on the battlefield had no bayonet wounds, and only 3 wounded Germans were taken prisoner. Due to this, the Germans assumed they took no prisoners of war. However, this claim was denied by the Australian official historian Gavin Long in his book Greece, Crete and Syria. He accepted that in the midst of the battle soldiers were clubbed and bayoneted. However, he denied Anzacs had killed the surrendering Germans. Walker also denied Germans had been killed illegally. Reg Saunders described the battle as "a short range very bloody action" and said, "Certainly skulls were broken and men stabbed ... it was hand-to-hand combat, and that's what happens." German accounts claimed the Anzacs had killed soldiers attempting to surrender, and this claim was supported by a German investigation finding it "suspicious" that many of the German dead had stab wounds and broken skulls.
