= Leslie Andrew =

Recipient of the Victoria Cross

Brigadier Leslie Wilton Andrew VC DSO
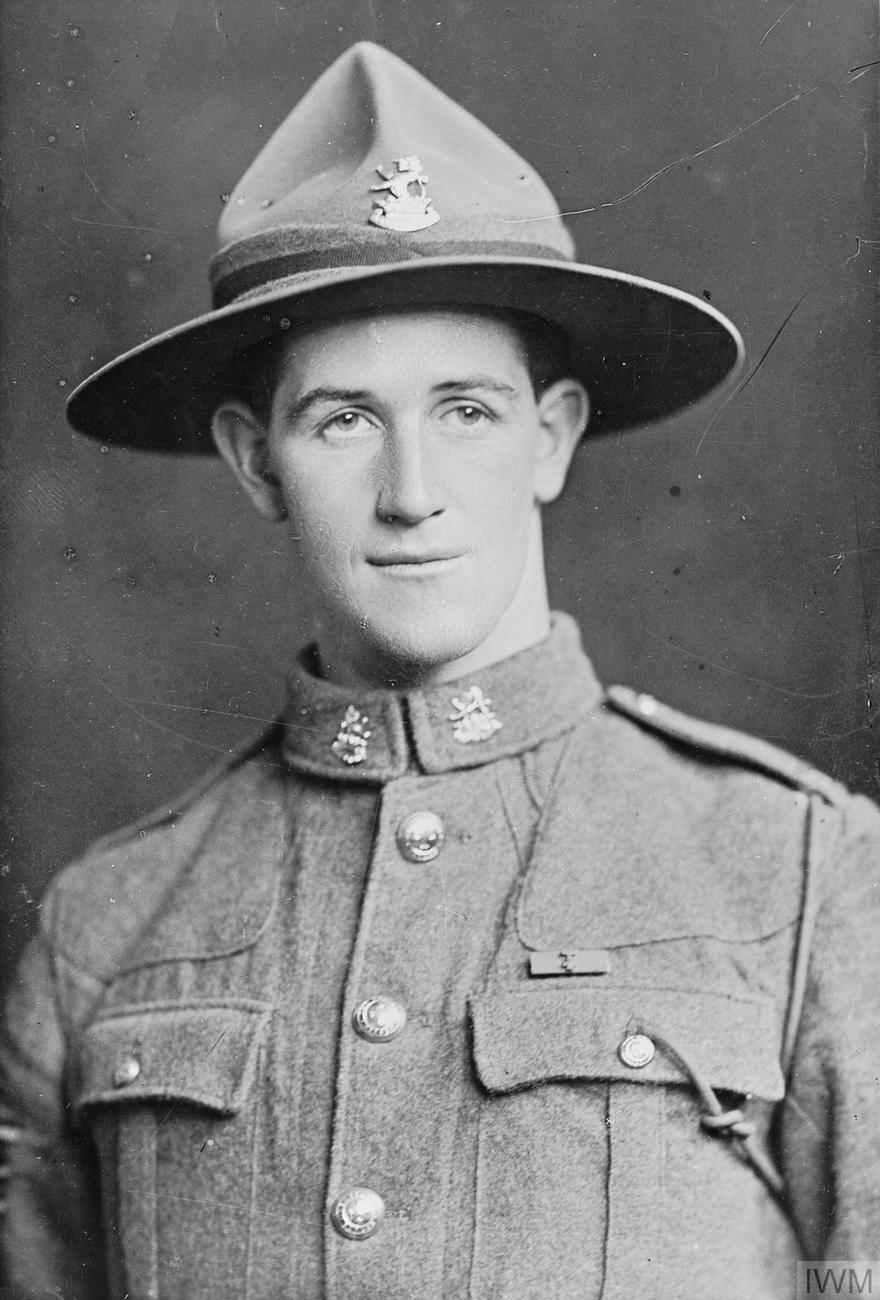
- Andrew after receiving his VC, in 1918
- Born: 23 March 1897; Ashhurst, Manawatu, New Zealand
- Died: 8 January 1969 (aged 71); Palmerston North, Manawatu, New Zealand
- Burial place: Levin RSA Cemetery, Levin, New Zealand
- Military career
- Allegiance: New Zealand
- Branch: New Zealand Military Forces
- Service years: 1915–52
- Rank: Brigadier
- Service number: 30250
- Commands: Wellington Fortress Area; 5th Infantry Brigade; 22nd Battalion
- Conflicts: First World War; Battle of Flers-Courcelette (WIA); Battle of Messines; Battle of Passchendaele; Battle of Pilckem Ridge (WIA); Second World War; Battle of Greece; Battle of Crete (WIA); North African campaign; Operation Crusader; Home Front
- Awards: Victoria Cross; Distinguished Service Order; Mention in Despatches

Brigadier Leslie Wilton Andrew, VC, DSO (23 March 1897 – 8 January 1969) was a senior officer in the New Zealand Military Forces and a recipient of the Victoria Cross, the highest award of the British Commonwealth for gallantry "in the face of the enemy". He received the decoration for his actions during the Battle of Passchendaele in 1917.

Andrew joined the New Zealand Expeditionary Force as a private in 1915, having gained military experience while serving with the Territorial Force. He saw action on the Western Front from September 1916 to early 1918, and ended the war as an officer in England. He remained in the military after the cessation of hostilities, and joined the New Zealand Staff Corps. He held staff and administrative positions in New Zealand and, while on an officer exchange program, British India.

Following the outbreak of the Second World War, Andrew was appointed commander of the 22nd Battalion, which he led during the Battles of Greece and Crete as well as the early part of the North African Campaign. For a short period in late 1941 he commanded an infantry brigade of the 2nd New Zealand Division, and was awarded the Distinguished Service Order for his leadership. He returned to New Zealand in 1942 and commanded the Wellington Fortress Area for the remainder of the war. He retired from the military in 1952 with the rank of brigadier, and died in 1969 aged 71.

== Early life ==
Leslie Wilton Andrew was born on 23 March 1897 in Ashhurst in the Manawatu region of New Zealand, the son of William Andrew, headmaster of a local school, and his wife, Frances Hannah. He grew up in Wanganui, where his father had moved his family having taken up a position in the area, and was educated at Wanganui Collegiate School. After leaving school in 1913 he worked for a solicitor and was later employed by the New Zealand Railways Department as a clerk.

Andrew participated in the cadet program while at school and later joined the Territorial Force. By 1915, he had been promoted to sergeant and had sat the necessary exams to become a commissioned officer in the Territorials.

== First World War ==
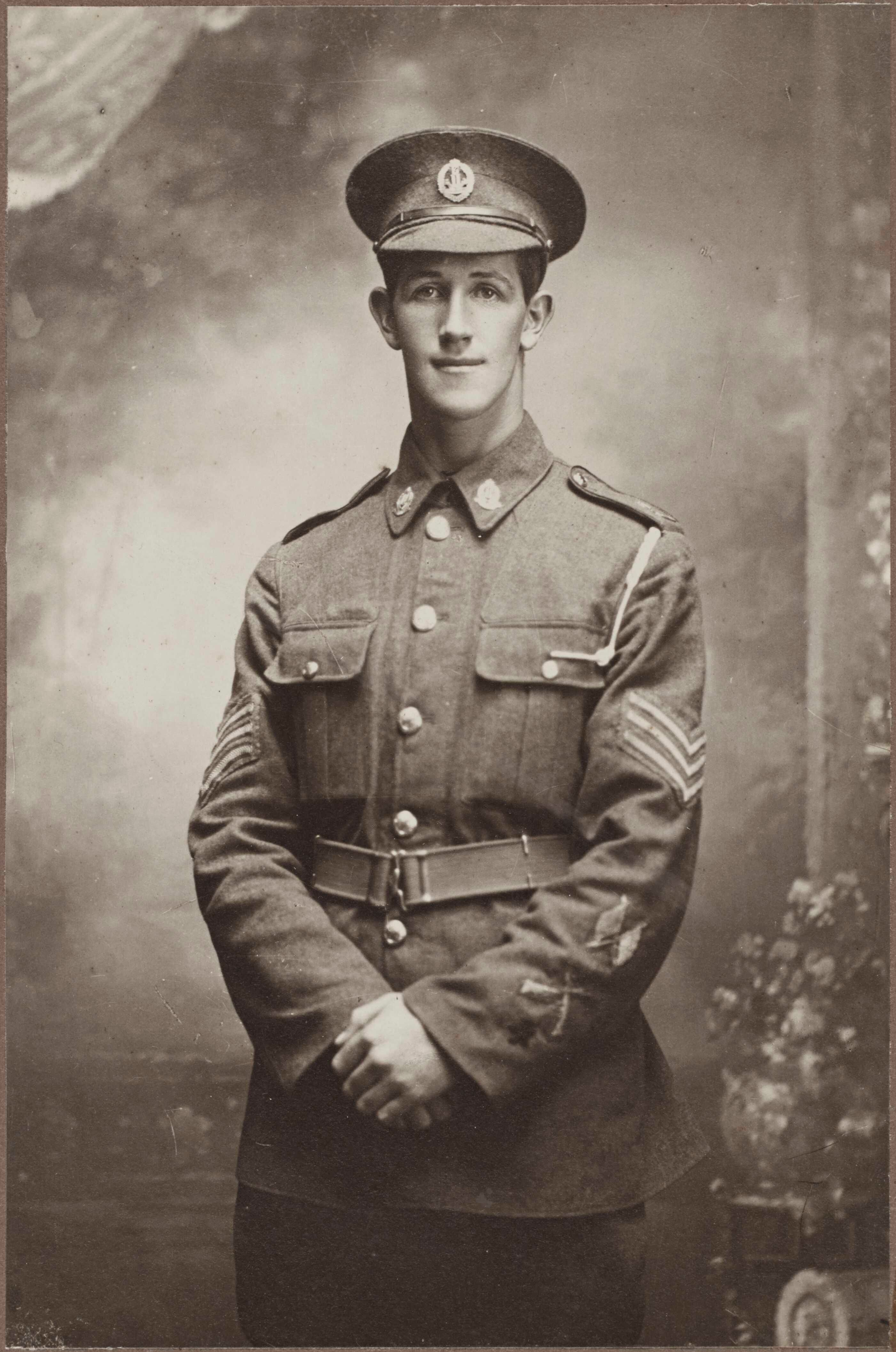
Andrew as a corporal, 1917.

Andrew volunteered for the New Zealand Expeditionary Force (NZEF) in October 1915, when he was 18. As only men between the ages of 20 and 40 could volunteer for service with the NZEF, he falsified his age to ensure that he would be eligible for duty overseas. A member of the 12th Reinforcements, he embarked for the Western Front via Egypt on 1 May 1916. In France, he was posted to B Company, 2nd Battalion, Wellington Infantry Regiment, with the rank of private.

Andrew's arrival at the front coincided with the start of the Somme Offensive. He participated in the Battle of Flers-Courcelette, which began on 15 September, and was wounded. Promoted to corporal in January 1917, he took part in the Battle of Messines the following June.

During the early phase of the Battle of Passchendaele, Andrew's battalion was engaged in fighting around the village of La Basseville, a few kilometres southwest of Messines. Originally captured by the New Zealanders prior to the battle on 26 July, the village had been re-taken by the Germans the next day. Under cover of an artillery barrage, the Wellingtons began an advance towards the village. Andrew was tasked with leading two sections to destroy a machine-gun post. During the advance, he noticed a nearby machine-gun post that was holding up the advance of another platoon. On his own initiative, he promptly diverted his force and removed the newly spotted threat with a flanking attack. He then led his men to the original objective. Despite continuous gunfire, he and his men captured the machine-gun post. While most of his men withdrew with the gun, Andrew and another man (Note: Private Laurence Robert Ritchie (14 August 1884 – 20 January 1971), 2nd Battalion, Wellington Infantry Regiment. Ritchie was later awarded the Distinguished Conduct Medal for his part in the operation.) continued to scout further forward. Coming across another machine-gun post, the two men destroyed it before returning to their lines with information on the increasing numbers of Germans in the area. During his foray, Andrew received a flesh wound to his back.

Andrew was awarded the Victoria Cross (VC) for his leadership and bravery at La Basseville. The VC, instituted in 1856, was the highest gallantry award that could be bestowed on a serviceman of the British Empire. The citation read as follows:

For most conspicuous bravery when in charge of a small party in an attack on the enemy's position. His objective was a machine-gun post which had been located in an isolated building. On leading his men forward he encountered unexpectedly a machine-gun post which was holding up the advance of another company; he immediately attacked, capturing the machine gun and killing several of the crew. He then continued the attack on the machine gun post which had been his original objective. He displayed great skill and determination in his disposition, finally capturing the post, killing several of the enemy and putting the remainder to flight. Cpl. Andrew's conduct throughout was unexampled for cool daring, initiative, and fine leadership, and his magnificent example was a great stimulant to his comrades.

— The London Gazette, No. 30272, 4 September 1917.

Aged 20, the youngest recipient in the NZEF to receive the VC, Andrew was promoted to sergeant the day after the action at La Basseville. He was presented with his VC by King George V in a ceremony at Buckingham Palace on 31 October 1917. Andrew continued to serve on the Western Front until he was sent to England for officer training. He was commissioned as a second lieutenant in March 1918, and was posted to Sling Camp, the main training facility for the NZEF, as an instructor. He was still in England when the war ended.

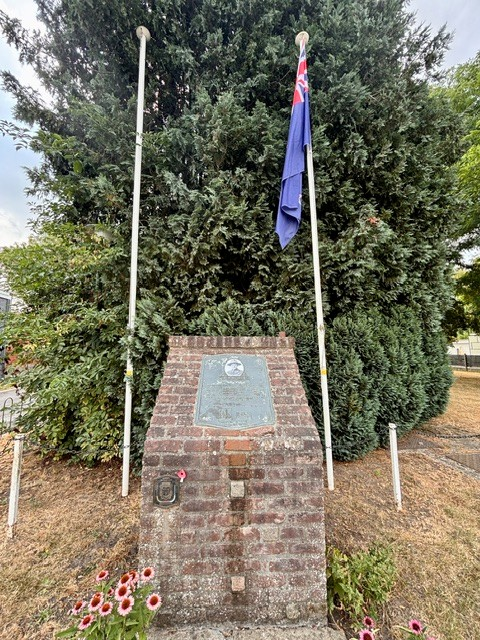
In the small village of Komen-Waasten is a memorial in Honor of Leslie Andrew, you can find it at: VC Memorial - Rue Faubourg de Lille 57 - 7784 Warneton

== Interwar period ==
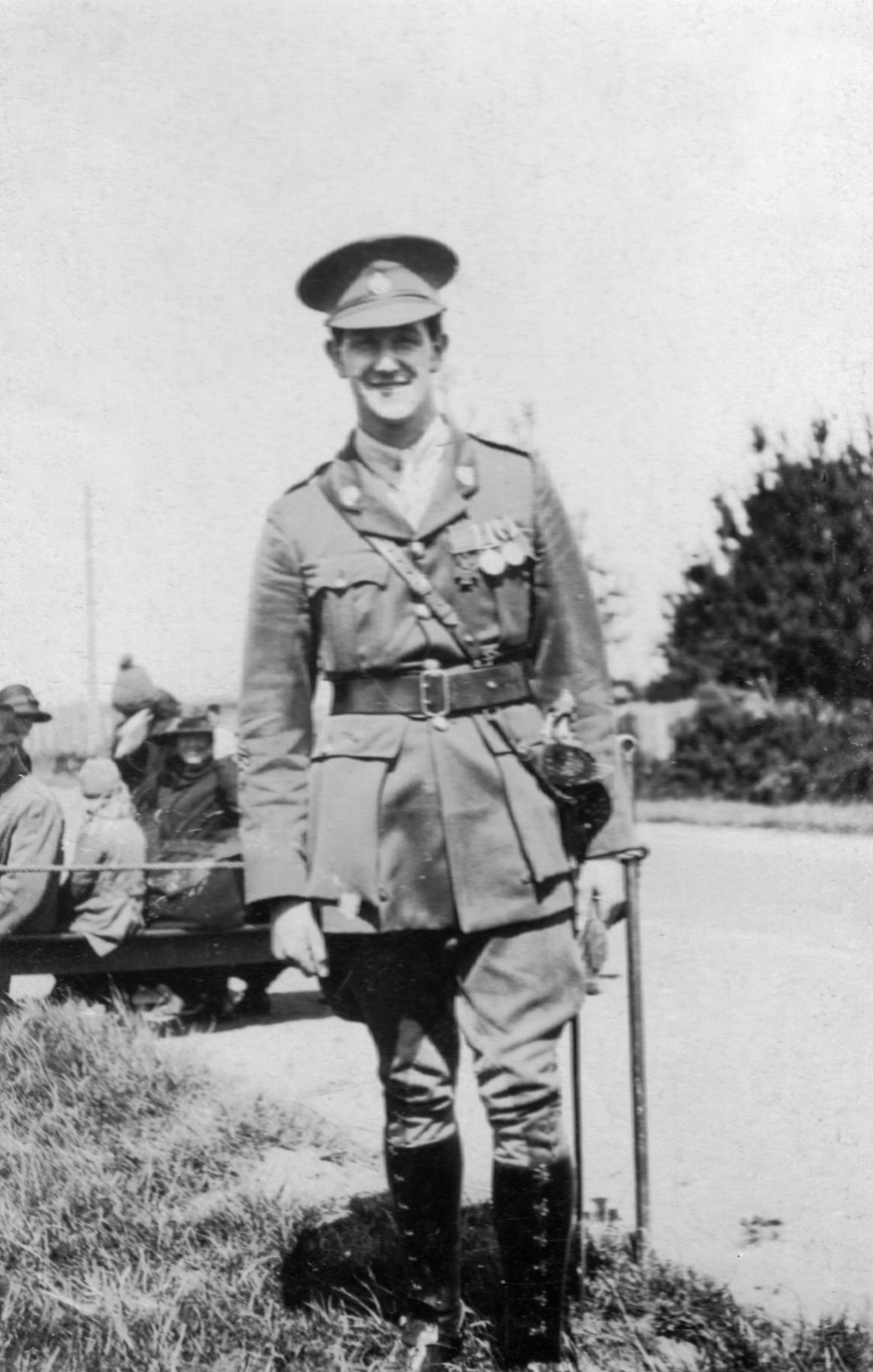
Andrew in 1927.

While in England, Andrew met Bessie Ball, of Nottingham, and they were married on 12 November 1918, the day after the Armistice with Germany. The couple had five children; one died in infancy. Discharged from the NZEF on his return to New Zealand in August 1919, Andrew opted to become a professional soldier and joined the New Zealand Staff Corps despite a poor assessment of his administrative skills by a senior officer. He served in staff positions for the next several years. From 1927 to 1929 he served with the Highland Light Infantry of the British Army, then based in British India, on an officer exchange program. On his return to New Zealand he was appointed adjutant of the 1st Wellington Regiment.

In 1937, having been promoted to captain, Andrew led the New Zealand contingent sent to London for the coronation of King George VI and Queen Elizabeth. While there, he returned to Buckingham Palace, where he had been presented with the VC, this time as commander of the New Zealand guard at the palace on 11 May 1937. Returning to staff duties in New Zealand, he was assistant adjutant and quartermaster general of the Central Military District.

== Second World War ==
Following the outbreak of the Second World War, Andrew, a major at the time, was seconded to the 2nd New Zealand Expeditionary Force (2NZEF). In early 1940, having been promoted to lieutenant colonel, he was appointed commander of 22nd Battalion, which was then forming at Trentham Military Camp near Wellington. He trained his new command hard, and quickly earned the nickname of February due to his habit of issuing 28-day detentions for any breaches in discipline.

In May 1940, the battalion sailed aboard the Empress of Britain as part of a convoy transporting the battalion's parent formation, the 5th Infantry Brigade, itself part of the 2nd New Zealand Division under Major General Bernard Freyberg, to the Middle East. The German invasion of Holland and Belgium prompted the diversion of the convoy to England. Arriving in June, the battalion, along with the rest of the brigade, formed a mobile reserve for XII Corps, which was tasked with defending the coast of Kent from a possible German invasion. In March 1941 it travelled for Egypt and then to Greece. Andrew led the battalion through the subsequent Battle of Greece, during which it saw little action apart from air raids and two minor engagements with the 2nd Panzer Division on 15 and 16 April at Mount Olympus.

=== Battle of Crete ===
Evacuated to Crete on 25 April 1941, the 5th Brigade was tasked with the defence of the Maleme airfield. At this stage, 22nd Battalion was regarded as the best of the battalions of the brigade so Andrew was ordered to hold the strategically important Point 107, the dominant hill overlooking the airfield. Forced to disperse the companies of his battalion widely to cover his positions, he closely oversaw the defensive arrangements and ensured sufficient ammunition for his men.

On 20 May 1941, the opening day of the Battle of Crete, 22nd Battalion was heavily bombed and strafed, and Andrew was lightly wounded. In the battalion's war diary he noted the bombing was worse than the artillery barrages of Passchendaele and the Somme. German paratroopers began landing in the area, including near his headquarters, and fighting took place at close quarters. Andrew soon lost communications with his forward companies but these were able to drive off the German attackers and hold their positions. The lack of contact with the companies to his front was a concern to Andrew as was the increasing presence of Germans to his rear. He requested support from the adjacent 23rd Battalion but this was refused by his brigade commander, Brigadier James Hargest. Andrew used his battalion reserve to mount a counterattack with the help of two Matilda tanks but this failed. Following this, he advised Hargest that he might have to withdraw from Point 107; "If you must you must" was the reply. Accordingly, Andrew withdrew the remaining units that he was able to contact. As it happened, most of his forward companies remained intact and, after finding they had been abandoned, were able to withdraw from Point 107.

The withdrawal to the positions of the 21st and 23rd Battalions came as a major surprise to Hargest, but instead of ordering an immediate counterattack, he directed Andrew take overall command of the defences of 5th Brigade and conceded the airfield was lost. Once senior commanders became aware of the situation, they ordered that it be rectified. Despite a counterattack to recapture the airfield mounted in the evening of 21 May and into the next morning, (Note: Charles Upham would be awarded the first of his two VCs during this failed counterattack.) Maleme airfield remained in the hands of the Germans. This was a significant factor in the German forces becoming established on Crete as it enabled much needed reinforcements to be landed by aircraft. Andrew and the surviving elements of his battalion were withdrawn from the area to Sphakia and, after acting as a defensive cordon, evacuated from Crete.

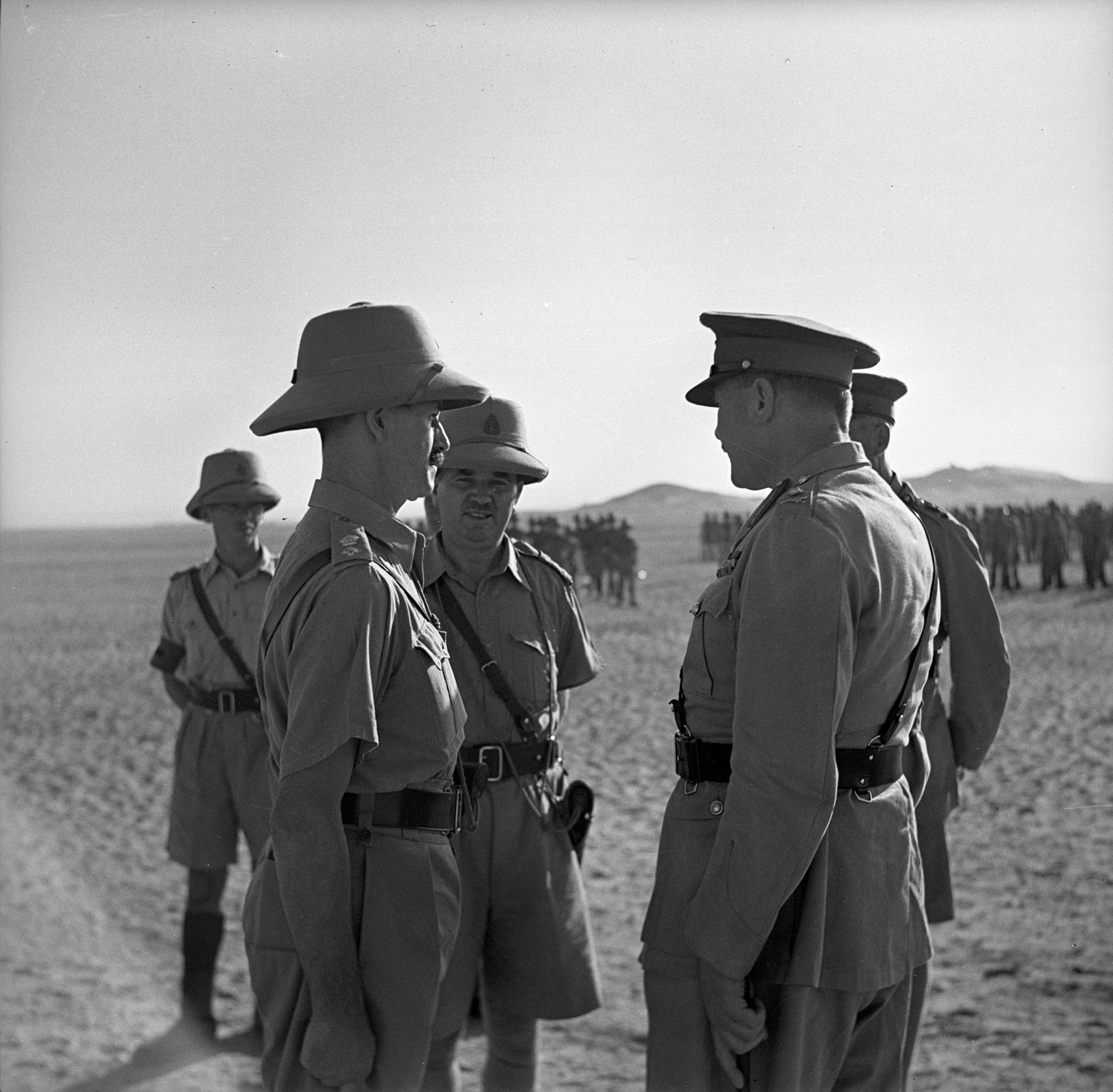
Lieutenant Colonel Andrew (left) with Major General Freyberg (right), commanding the 2nd New Zealand Division, Egypt, July 1941

=== North Africa ===
In Egypt, where the 2nd New Zealand Division was being rebuilt after the losses of Greece and Crete, Andrew and Hargest gave evidence in an inquiry on the conduct of the fighting on Crete. Officially, 5th Brigade was held blameless. Andrew remained as commander of 22nd Battalion during the early phases of the North African campaign. At one point during the efforts to lift the siege of Tobruk, his battalion was surrounded at Menastir and fought off elements of the 21st Panzer Division. His leadership during this time was later recognised with a Mention in Despatches.

When Hargest, still commanding 5th Brigade, was captured on 27 November 1941, Andrew was given temporary command of the brigade the next day. He led the brigade up until 8 December 1941, including a period, from 1 to 3 December, when it was besieging Bardia and fighting off German attempts to relieve the town. He reverted to command of the battalion on 9 December 1941 but was later rewarded with the Distinguished Service Order (DSO) for his leadership of the brigade. He relinquished command of 22nd Battalion in February 1942 and returned to New Zealand in response to a need for experienced officers to oversee development of home defences after the entry of Japan into the war.

== Later life ==
Back in New Zealand, Andrew was promoted to full colonel and appointed commander of the Wellington Fortress Area. He was formally discharged from the 2NZEF in October 1943, reverting to the regular army thereafter. He continued leading the Wellington Fortress Area for the rest of the war. In the immediate postwar period, he commanded the New Zealand contingent for the 1946 Victory Parade in London, and the following year attended the Imperial Defence College. He was promoted to brigadier in 1948 and appointed commander of the Central Military District. He continued in this appointment until his retirement from the military in 1952. He was later invited to run for Parliament but declined. In 1953, Andrew was awarded the Queen Elizabeth II Coronation Medal.

Andrew died on 8 January 1969 at Palmerston North hospital after a brief illness. Survived by his wife and four children, he was buried with full military honours in a ceremony at Levin RSA Cemetery, in Levin. His funeral was attended by three fellow VC recipients, including Reverend Keith Elliott, a former soldier of the 22nd Battalion, who also provided a reading. A barracks at Linton Army Camp is named after him; in Belgium, in the village of Warneton, just south of La Basseville, there is a commemorative plaque in his memory. On 31 July 2017, the 100-year anniversary of the action at La Basseville that earned him the VC, a plaque in Andrew's memory was unveiled at the Wellington railway station.

== Legacy ==
In 1953, the book Crete, one of the volumes of the Official History of New Zealand in the Second World War, written by Dan Davin and edited by Howard Kippenberger, the latter a friend and fellow battalion commander in the 2NZEF who was present at Crete, was published. In it, Andrew was criticised for his handling of the action at Maleme that ultimately led to the loss of Crete. In private correspondence to Davin, Kippenberger expressed the view that Andrew should have fought his battalion to the last man. Andrew took offence at the public criticism and his relations with Kippenberger would be distant and cool thereafter. As a result, Andrew was also reluctant to contribute to the official history of the 22nd Battalion, implying to its author that Kippenberger would distort events as he believed he had with the Crete book.

Andrew did have his supporters, including former soldiers of the 22nd Battalion, and Bernard Freyberg, the overall commander on Crete, did not blame Andrew for the loss of the island. The lethargic and indecisive conduct of his brigade commander, James Hargest, in the early stages of the fighting on the island was also a significant factor in Maleme airfield falling to the Germans.

== VC ==
Andrew's Victoria Cross was displayed at the National Army Museum in Waiouru. In December 2007 it was one of nine VCs among 96 medals stolen from the museum. On 16 February 2008, New Zealand Police announced that all the medals had been recovered as a result of a NZ$300,000 reward offered by Michael Ashcroft and Tom Sturgess.
