= Keith Elliott =

Recipient of the Victoria Cross

Keith Elliott VC
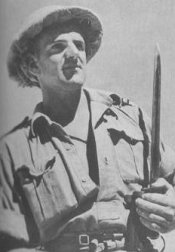
- Keith Elliott c.1942
- Born: 25 April 1916; Āpiti, New Zealand
- Died: 7 October 1989 (aged 73); Wellington, New Zealand
- Military career
- Allegiance: New Zealand
- Branch: New Zealand Military Forces
- Service years: 1939–1943
- Rank: Second Lieutenant
- Unit: 22nd Battalion
- Conflicts: Second World War; Balkans campaign; North African campaign; First Battle of El Alamein
- Awards: Victoria Cross
- Other work: Anglican priest

Keith Elliott, VC (25 April 1916 – 7 October 1989) was a New Zealand soldier who served with the New Zealand Military Forces during the Second World War. He was awarded the Victoria Cross, the highest award for gallantry in the face of the enemy that can be awarded to British and Commonwealth forces, for his actions in the First Battle of El Alamein.

Born in Āpiti, near Kimbolton, New Zealand in the Manawatū, Elliott was a farm manager when the Second World War began. He volunteered for service abroad with the Second New Zealand Expeditionary Force (2NZEF) and was posted to the 22nd Battalion. He saw action during the Battles of Greece and Crete and then in North Africa. By now a sergeant, during Operation Crusader in November 1941, he was one of 700 New Zealanders made prisoners of war when their position was overrun by the Germans. Freed two months later, he was serving as a platoon commander during the First Battle of El Alamein. After he was awarded his VC, he was promoted to second lieutenant, sent home to New Zealand and discharged from the 2NZEF.

Returning to civilian life, he resumed his farming career, but in 1948 became a priest. He shifted around the lower half of the North Island for the next several years, serving in a number of churches. He was also a chaplain in the Territorial Force. He retired from the priesthood in 1981 and died eight years later at the age of 73.

== Early life ==
Keith Elliott was born on 25 April 1916 in Āpiti, New Zealand, one of nine children of a farmer and his wife. He was educated in nearby Feilding, firstly at Lytton Street School and then at Feilding Agricultural High School. He was unable to complete his formal schooling because in 1933, he had to drop out to work on the family farm. Two years later, he began managing a large farm at Marima.

== Second World War ==
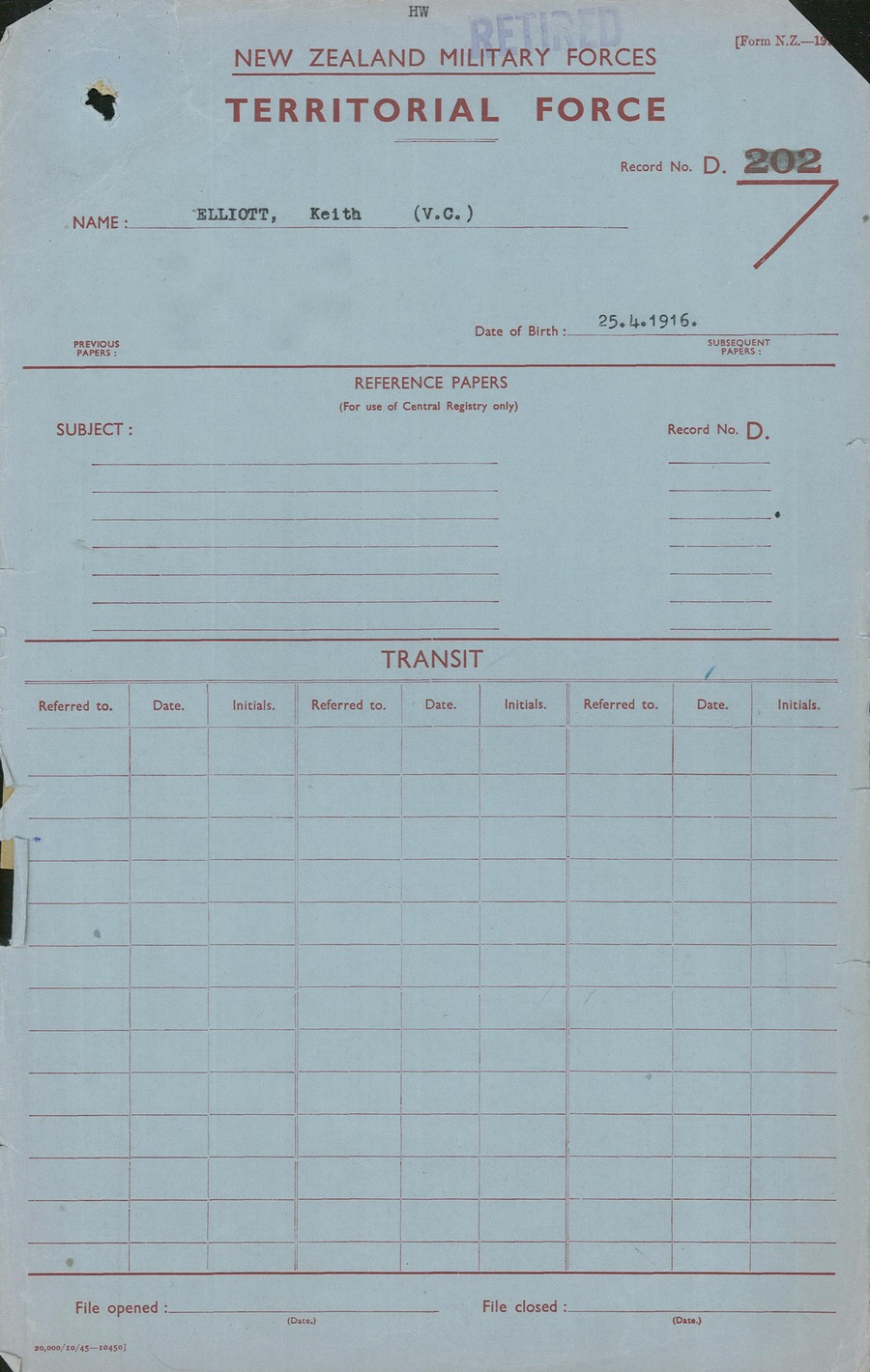
Keith Elliott WWII Personnel File (1939 - 1945)

Elliott tried to enlist in the New Zealand Military Forces on hearing of the outbreak of the Second World War but was initially declined due to the poor state of his teeth. He was successful on a later attempt and in January 1940 he joined the Second New Zealand Expeditionary Force (2NZEF) that was raised for service overseas. He was posted to 22nd Battalion, commanded by a Victoria Cross winner of the First World War, Lieutenant Colonel Leslie Andrew. The battalion embarked for the Middle East as part of the Second Echelon of the 2NZEF but was diverted to England during transit. It arrived in England in June 1940, where it remained for the rest of the year on garrison duty. While in England, Elliott was promoted to lance corporal.

In early 1941, the Second Echelon was redesignated the 5th Infantry Brigade, 2nd New Zealand Division, and was sent to Greece as part of an Allied contingent set to counter a likely invasion by the Germans. His battalion was positioned at the Olympus Pass, and shortly after the invasion commenced, engaged advancing German tanks. The New Zealanders withdrew after a day, beginning a gradual retreat from the country. Evacuated to Crete on 25 April, 22nd Battalion was defending Maleme airfield when German paratroopers attacked on 20 May. The airfield was abandoned that evening much to Elliott's displeasure as his platoon was holding their positions. The Allies were eventually evacuated to Egypt a week later, but not before Elliott was wounded in the arm in a skirmish with enemy paratroopers.

=== North Africa ===
While the division was refitting and rearming following the fighting in Greece and Crete, Elliott was promoted to lance sergeant, then platoon sergeant. In November 1941, during Operation Crusader, his platoon was attached to the headquarters of the 5th Infantry Brigade for security. On 27 November, he, along with 700 other men, were captured when the headquarters was overrun by elements of Generalleutnant (Lieutenant General) Erwin Rommel's Afrika Corps, which had outflanked the Allies. He spent two months under harsh conditions in captivity before being liberated by South African troops. He lost a considerable amount of weight during his time as a prisoner of war. He rejoined the 2nd New Zealand Division which was refitting in Syria, but then contracted malaria and missed out on its hasty recall to Egypt and the subsequent fighting at Minqar Qaim.

On his recovery, Elliott rejoined the 22nd Battalion on 13 July 1942, in time for the First Battle of Alamein. The battalion was short of commissioned officers, and he found himself acting platoon commander for the forthcoming operation to capture Ruweisat Ridge. After commencing the attack early in the morning of 15 July, the battalion reached the ridge and began digging in. At daybreak, it was discovered that the New Zealanders had passed several German tanks during their advance the previous evening. Elliott spotted the tanks when they began advancing towards the 22nd Battalion's position at dawn and notified the commanders of nearby platoons. However, they believed the tanks to be British and disregarded Elliott's warning until the German tanks began attacking the battalion's positions. It was then that Elliott performed the actions that led to the award of the Victoria Cross (VC). The citation for his VC read:

At dawn on 15 July 1942 the battalion to which Sergeant Elliot belonged was attacked on three flanks by tanks. Under heavy tank, machine-gun and shell fire, Sergeant Elliott led the platoon he was commanding to the cover of a ridge three hundred yards away, during which he sustained a chest wound. Here he re-formed his men and led them to a dominating ridge a further five hundred yards away, where they came under heavy enemy machine-gun and mortar fire. He located enemy machine-gun posts to his front and right flank, and while one section attacked on the right flank, Sergeant Elliott led seven men in a bayonet charge across five hundred yards of open ground in the face of heavy fire and captured four enemy machine-gun posts and an anti-tank gun, killing a number of the enemy and taking fifty prisoners. His section then came under fire from a machine-gun post on the left flank. He immediately charged this post single-handed and succeeded in capturing it, killing several of the enemy and taking fifteen prisoners. During these two assaults he sustained three more wounds in the back and legs. Although badly wounded in four places, Sergeant Elliott refused to leave his men until he had reformed them, handed over his prisoners, which were now increased to one hundred and thirty, and arranged for his men to rejoin the battalion. Owing to Sergeant Elliott's quick grasp of the situation, great personal courage and leadership, nineteen men, who were the only survivors of B Company of his battalion, captured and destroyed five machine-guns, one anti-tank gun, killed a great number of the enemy and captured one hundred and thirty prisoners. Sergeant Elliott sustained only one casualty amongst his men, and brought him back to the nearest advanced dressing station.

— The London Gazette, No. 35715, 22 September 1942

All of the 22nd Battalion, bar Elliott's platoon, were killed or captured during the fighting at Ruweisat Ridge. Some of the other battalions that participated in the battle also incurred heavy losses. Elliott managed to link up with elements of the 21st Battalion, the commander of which recommended him for the VC. Elliott was evacuated to hospital where he spent three months recovering from his various wounds before he returned to his battalion in September.

His VC was gazetted on 24 September 1942, but Elliott had learnt of his award the previous day. His divisional commander, Major General Bernard Freyberg, commissioned Elliott in the field as a second lieutenant shortly afterwards. He was presented with his VC ribbon by Lieutenant General Bernard Montgomery and was ordered to return to New Zealand. It is likely that this was due to the desire of military authorities to keep him out of harm's way following the recent capture of the division's other VC winner, Charles Upham, at Ruweisat. Elliott was unhappy at being sent home while his friends remained in the field. He was also uncomfortable with the attention he received from the public when he arrived back in New Zealand and remained modest about his achievements. He was discharged from the 2NZEF in December 1943 and resumed farming.

== Later life ==
In February 1944, Elliott married Margaret Rachel Markham. The couple had first met before the war and would go on to have five children. Although he continued farming, he became interested in a career in the Anglican Church. Encouraged by a friend who had been a chaplain in the military, he began training for the priesthood in February 1946. He became a priest in 1948 and took up a curacy in Palmerston North, before becoming chaplain at the nearby Linton Military Camp. This entailed him joining the New Zealand Territorial Force with the rank of chaplain, 4th class.

For the next several years, Elliott moved around a number of parishes in the lower North Island. He also spent periods of time at the City Mission in Wellington. He was present at the unveiling of the Alamein Memorial in Egypt in 1954, and two years later attended VC centenary celebrations in London. In 1967, he co-authored a book of his life, From Cowshed to Dog Collar. He retired from the priesthood in April 1981 and moved to Raumati.

In 1953, Elliott was awarded the Queen Elizabeth II Coronation Medal, and in 1977 he received the Queen Elizabeth II Silver Jubilee Medal.

He died of cancer on 7 October 1989, survived by his wife and five children. He was buried with full military honours at Paraparaumu Cemetery.

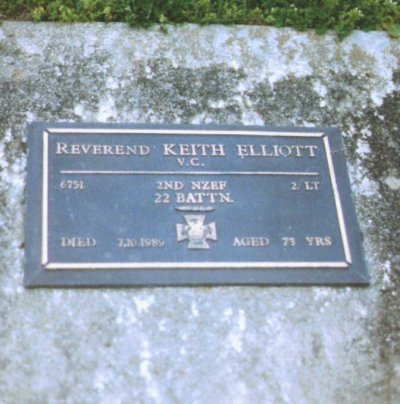
Elliott's headstone at Paraparaumu Cemetery, North Island, New Zealand. Returned Serviceman's Lawn Section.

Elliott donated his Victoria Cross to his former school, Feilding Agricultural High School, in 1972. It was later loaned to the QEII Army Memorial Museum in Waiouru for display. It was one of nine Victoria Crosses among 96 medals stolen from the museum on 2 December 2007. On 16 February 2008, the New Zealand Police announced all the medals had been recovered as a result of a NZ$300,000 reward offered by Michael Ashcroft and Tom Sturgess.
