= 23rd Battalion (New Zealand) =

- Active: 1939–1945
- Country: New Zealand
- Branch: New Zealand Military Forces
- Type: Infantry
- Size: ~700–900 personnel
- Part of: 5th Brigade, 2nd Division
- Engagements: Second World War: Battle of Greece; Battle of Crete; North African Campaign; Italian Campaign

The 23rd Battalion, also known as the Canterbury-Otago Battalion, was an infantry battalion of the New Zealand Military Forces during the Second World War. Formed in November 1939 as part of the 5th Brigade, 2nd Division of the 2nd New Zealand Expeditionary Force. After undertaking training at Burnham Camp the battalion sailed from New Zealand on 1 May 1940. The battalion saw action in Greece, Crete, North Africa, and Italy.

== History ==
=== Formation and training ===
Following the outbreak of the Second World War, the New Zealand government authorised the formation of the 2nd New Zealand Expeditionary Force (2NZEF), for service at home and abroad. Following consultation with the British government, it was decided that the main New Zealand contribution to the war effort would be in the form of an infantry division, the 2nd New Zealand Division, under the command of Major General Bernard Freyberg. The new division would require nine battalions of infantry and consequently, several infantry battalions were formed from 1939 to 1940 with New Zealand volunteers.

The 23rd Battalion, (Note: The numbering of the battalions raised for the 2NZEF followed that of the existing 17 infantry battalions of the Territorial Force. The 23rd Battalion was the sixth such unit of the 2NZEF, preceded by the 18th to 22nd Battalions.) also known as the Canterbury-Otago Battalion, was formed in January 1940 under the command of Lieutenant Colonel A. S. Falconer. It was the last of three infantry battalions designated to make up the second echelon of the 2nd New Zealand Division, destined for overseas service. (Note: The other two infantry battalions were the 21st and 22nd.) Its personnel were all volunteers were drawn from the South Island of New Zealand. They were formed into four rifle companies, designated A to D and corresponding to the Canterbury, Southland, Nelson/Marlborough/West Coast and Otago districts.

After completing rudimentary training, the battalion embarked for England in May 1940 as part of the 5th Infantry Brigade, 2nd New Zealand Division. Sailing on the transport Andes, they made port calls at Perth, in Australia, Cape Town, and Freetown before arriving at Gourock, in Scotland, in June. Following this, the battalion spent the remainder of the year on garrison duties in the south of England where they were positioned to respond in case of a cross-Channel invasion by the Germans in the wake of the Fall of France.

== Greece ==
The British Government anticipated an invasion of Greece by the Germans in 1941 and decided to send troops to support the Greeks, who were already engaged against the Italians in Albania. The 2nd New Zealand Division was one of a number of Allied units dispatched to Greece in early March.

== Commanding officers ==
The following officers served as commanding officer of 23rd Battalion:

- Lieutenant Colonel A. S. Falconer (January–August 1940; March–May 1941);
- Lieutenant Colonel D. F. Leckie (August 1940–March 1941; May–June 1941);
- Lieutenant Colonel R. E. Romans (June 1941; July 1942–April 1943; August–December 1943); (Note: Romans had the rank of major during his first period in command of the battalion.)
- Lieutenant Colonel C. N. Watson (June–July 1942);
- Lieutenant Colonel J. R. J. Connolly (April–May 1943; December 1943–May 1944);
- Lieutenant Colonel M. C. Fairbrother (May–August 1943);
- Lieutenant Colonel W. B. Thomas (December 1943; June–August 1944; October 1944–May 1945);
- Lieutenant Colonel E. D. Blundell (May 1944);
- Lieutenant Colonel E. A. McPhail (May–June 1944; August–October 1944);
- Lieutenant Colonel D. G. Grant (May–September 1945);
- Major D. P. W. Harvey (September–December 1945).

== Notes ==
Footnotes

Citations
