= Neil Lloyd Macky =

New Zealand lawyer and military officer

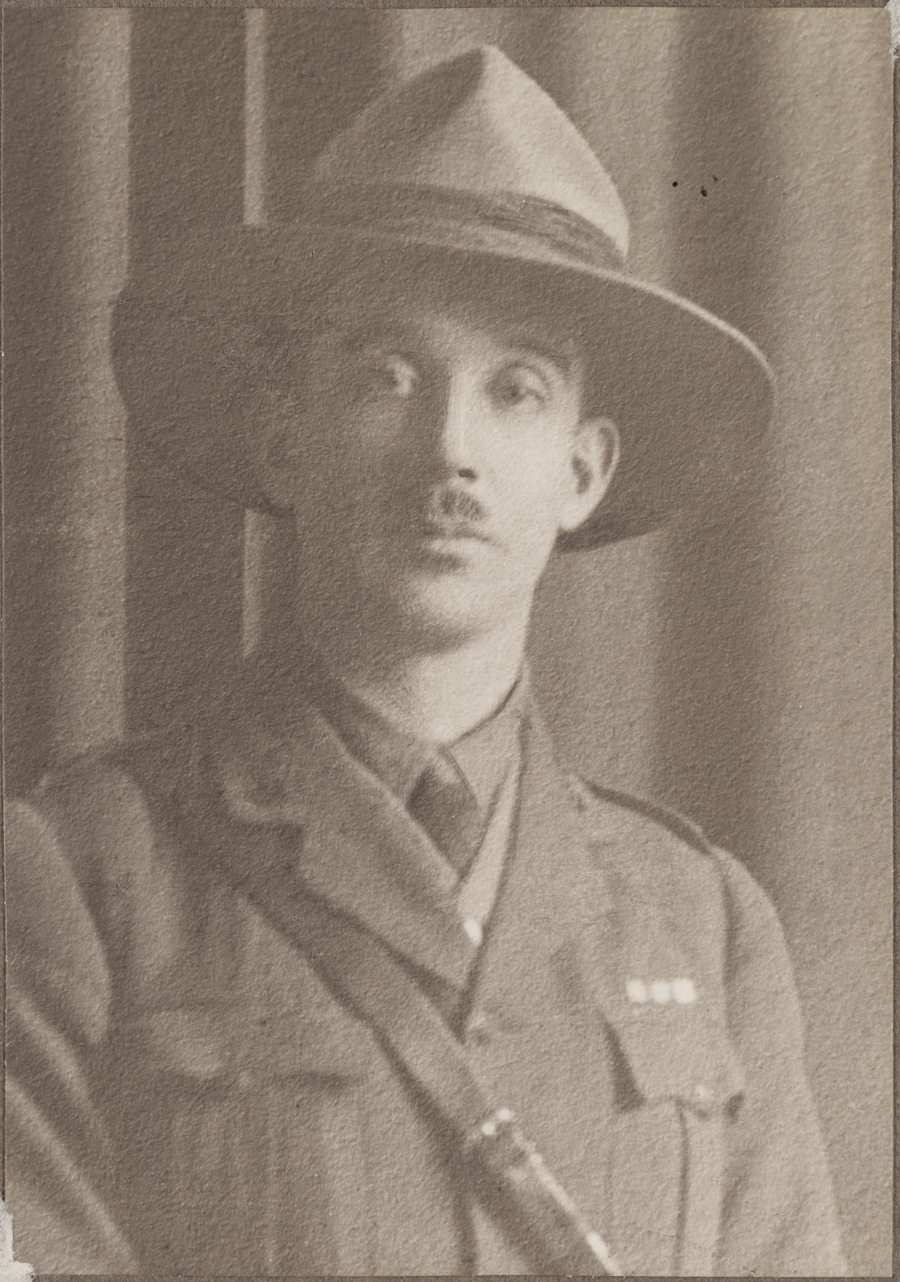
- Born: 20 February 1891; Auckland, New Zealand
- Died: 4 October 1981 (aged 90); Auckland, New Zealand
- Military career
- Allegiance: New Zealand
- Branch: New Zealand Military Forces
- Rank: Colonel
- Commands: 21st Battalion; Bay of Islands Fortress Area
- Conflicts: First World War; Senussi Campaign; Western Front; Second World War; Battle of Greece
- Awards: Military Cross

Colonel Neil Lloyd Macky MC (20 February 1891 – 4 October 1981) was a New Zealand lawyer and military officer.

Born in Auckland, New Zealand, Macky earned a law degree from Auckland University College and set himself up as a sole practitioner. He joined the New Zealand Expeditionary Force (NZEF) in 1915 and was commissioned as an officer in the New Zealand Rifle Brigade. He served during the Senussi Campaign in the Middle East and on the Western Front. His leadership during the Battle of Flers–Courcelette earned him the Military Cross. After the war he returned to his legal career. He was also a senior officer in the Territorial Force (TF) in which he commanded an infantry brigade. In 1937, Macky was one of four TF colonels that publicly protested reforms that reduced personnel and affected morale in the TF. He was punished by being placed on the retired list. Recalled to duty in the Second World War, he commanded the 21st Battalion during the Battle of Greece. Repatriated to New Zealand after the battle, he commanded the Bay of Islands Fortress Area until he was placed on the reserve of officers. After the war he returned to his law firm for which he was practice manager. He died in 1981 at the age of 90.

== Early life ==
Macky, the son of a clerk, was born in Auckland, New Zealand, on 20 February 1891. He was educated at Prince Albert College and then went onto Auckland University College to study law. He graduated with a law degree in 1912 and shortly afterwards was admitted as a solicitor. A year later he set up his own law practice as a barrister.

== First World War ==
In 1915, Macky volunteered to join the New Zealand Expeditionary Force (NZEF) which had been raised for service in the First World War. He was posted to the 1st Battalion of the New Zealand Rifle Brigade as a second lieutenant in October that year. He served in the Middle East during the brief Senussi Campaign before the brigade, as part of the newly formed New Zealand Division, embarked for the Western Front in April 1916. The first major engagement of the division's service in Europe was the Battle of Flers–Courcelette in September 1916. On 15 September, during the battle, Macky, newly promoted to a full lieutenant, won a Military Cross for his leadership of two platoons that dealt with a German counterattack.

Promoted to temporary captain in October 1916, Macky was wounded two months later. He was evacuated to England to recuperate from his wounds before returning to France. His rank was made substantive in April 1918. Following the cessation of hostilities, he was sent into Germany with the New Zealand Division for occupation duties. On his return to New Zealand in May 1919, he was discharged from the NZEF.

== Interwar period ==
On his return to civilian life, Macky resumed his legal career but maintained an interest in the military by joining the Territorial Force (TF). Previously a sole practitioner, he went into partnership with another solicitor in 1920. Much of the firm's work was in property conveyancing work and in 1928, Macky, having purchased his partner's share of the practice, merged his firm into what later became Russell McVeagh. Many of the partners of the firm, like Macky, were officers in the TF. (Note: One partner was Harold Barrowclough who later became a major general in command of the 3rd New Zealand Division during the Second World War.) Macky was promoted to major in the TF in 1926 and to colonel in 1931, at which time he was in command of the Auckland Regiment. Six years later, he was appointed commander of the 1st New Zealand Infantry Brigade.

=== Four Colonel's Revolt ===
In 1937, the TF was the subject of reforms carried out by Major General John Duigan, the Chief of General Staff of the New Zealand Military Forces, to improve efficiencies in the organisation. Several regiments were disbanded and were reconstituted as battalions while a number of senior officers were placed in retirement. The morale of the TF declined as those senior officers who were left raised concerns, disregarded by Duigan, over the state of the army. Macky was one of four colonels in the TF who publicly protested the reforms in what became known as the Four Colonels' Revolt. This was a breach of military regulations, which prohibited military personnel from communicating with journalists unless they had permission to do so. Instead of a court-martial, which he feared would generate public sympathy for the colonels, Duigan placed all four officers on the retired list as punishment. The revolt did result in greater public awareness of the poor state of New Zealand's military, but little was done to rectify the situation.

== Second World War ==
Despite his involvement in the revolt of 1937, following the outbreak of the Second World War Macky was appointed commander of the 21st Battalion which was being raised for service overseas as part of the Second New Zealand Expeditionary Force (2NZEF). The battalion shipped out to England with the 2nd Echelon of the 2NZEF in May and served garrison duty in the south of England for several months. By early 1941, the British Government anticipated an invasion of Greece by the Germans and decided to send troops to support the Greeks. The 2nd New Zealand Division, which included 21st Battalion, was one of a number of Allied units dispatched to Greece in early March.

When the expected invasion began, Macky's battalion was involved in a rearguard action at Platamón for two days from 14 April. Shortly afterwards, along with two Australian battalions, it carried out a delaying action at Piniós Gorge but was cut off and became fragmented. Macky had misjudged the placement of his forces and German tanks managed to get through the gorge and force the retreat of his battalion. He, along with 39 other personnel of the battalion, were able to evade capture and made his way to Crete to rejoin what was left of the battalion. However, he was suffering from dysentery and was hospitalised. Although he was later mentioned in despatches for his service during the Battle of Greece, the divisional commander, Major General Bernard Freyberg, dismissed him as battalion commander for his handling of the action at Piniós Gorge.

Repatriated to New Zealand in September 1941, the following year Macky was appointed commander of the Bay of Islands Fortress Area. He served in this capacity until February 1944, at which stage he was placed on the officer's reserve.

== Later life ==
After the war, Macky returned to his law firm where he acted as practice manager. In his retirement, he remained active as a legal consultant but also increased his involvement in charitable work. He died on 4 October 1981, survived by two children. His wife had predeceased him in 1978.

== Notes ==
Footnotes

Citations
