= 5th Infantry Brigade (New Zealand) =

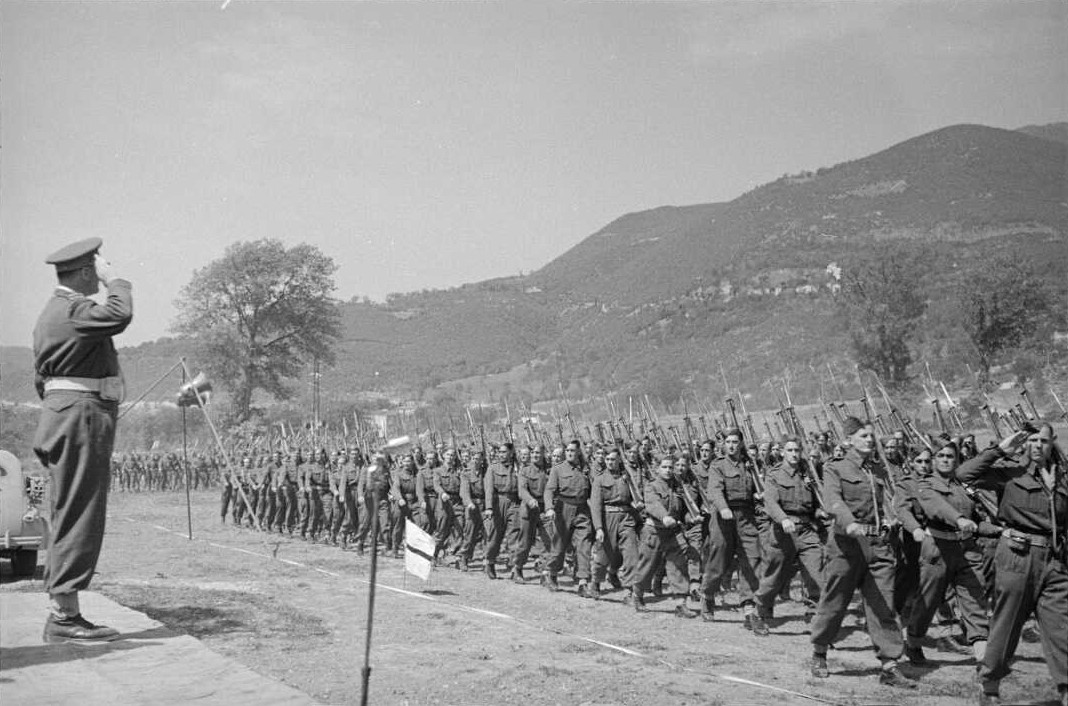
- 5th Infantry Brigade on parade in Italy, 8 May 1944
- Active: 1940–45
- Country: New Zealand
- Branch: New Zealand Military Forces
- Type: Infantry
- Size: Brigade
- Part of: 2nd New Zealand Division
- Engagements: World War II: Battle of Greece; Battle of Crete; North African Campaign; Italian Campaign

Commanders
- Notable commanders: James Hargest; Howard Kippenberger; Keith Lindsay Stewart

The 5th Infantry Brigade was an infantry brigade formation of the New Zealand Military Forces, active during World War II as part of the 2nd New Zealand Division. It saw service during the Battle of Greece, the Battle of Crete, the North African Campaign and the Italian Campaign before being disbanded in late 1945.

== History ==
Shortly after the outbreak of the war in September 1939, the New Zealand government authorised the formation of a 'Special Force', what would later be designed the Second New Zealand Expeditionary Force (2NZEF), of 6,600 men for service overseas. After consultation with the British government, it was decided that New Zealand's primary contribution to the war effort would be in the form of an infantry division. Formed in early 1940, the 5th Infantry Brigade was the second of the three echelons of the 2nd New Zealand Division. Commanded by Brigadier James Hargest, the brigade consisted of three infantry battalions, these being the 21st (with men drawn from the Auckland Military District), the 22nd (Central Military District), and the 23rd (South Island Military District).

The brigade left for the Middle East in May 1940 but while en route to Aden, the news of the invasion of Holland and Belgium prompted the diversion of the troop convoy to England by way of Cape Town. It arrived in mid-June and formed part of the United Kingdom's defences against an expected invasion by Germany. The brigade was designated for counterattacks on any enemy forces landing in the Surrey, Kent, Sussex, and Hampshire counties. It also began to receive its heavy equipment, including artillery and transport, while the infantry was nearly fully equipped. It was moved to Dover in September, in the face of increased activity by the Germans on the opposite coast.

However, by November the threat of invasion had receded and the brigade left the United Kingdom for the Middle East the following month. It arrived at the 2NZEF camp at Helwan in Egypt in early March 1941, completing the full strength of the 2nd New Zealand Division. The New Zealanders were to shortly be dispatched to Greece.

=== Greece ===
The start of the Greece campaign marked the division's first offensive operations as a complete formation. Sent to Greece alongside the Australian 6th Division and a British armoured brigade in order to support the Greeks in their defence against an expected invasion by the Germans, the New Zealanders manned the Aliakmon Line, with the 5th Brigade remaining in reserve in Athens until it moved to Olympus Pass, its designated defensive position, on 29 March 1941. For the time being, the 28th (Māori) Battalion was attached to the brigade; it was positioned on the left flank, 22nd Battalion was in the centre, controlling the road the through the pass while 23rd Battalion was on the right, on the slopes of Mt. Olympus itself. The 21st Battalion had been detached for guard duties at Piræus so did not join up with the brigade at first. When released, it moved to the Platamon Tunnel near the coast, where it came under the control of ANZAC Corps.

When the German invasion of Greece commenced, their advance was so rapid that the 4th Brigade was moved to the Servia Pass from its original position on the Aliakmon Line; the 5th Brigade remained in position. Its first contact with the Germans was in the evening of 12 April, when the artillery covering the brigade shelled a party trying the bridge the Aliakmon River. From 14 April, the 21st Battalion then fended off a series of attacks by elements of the 2nd Panzer Division attempting to flank the 2nd New Zealand Division. Its initial reports of an armoured advance was initially discounted by ANZAC Corps headquarters. The battalion held off several infantry attacks before withdrawing on 16 April to Pinios Gorge, having delayed the advance by 36 hours. Meanwhile the rest of the brigade was also engaged with the German forces, holding off several tanks supported by infantry and enduring mortar and artillery fire until being ordered by Freyberg to withdraw to the Thermopylae Line on 16 April. Much of their transport had been destroyed and the withdrawal was carried out on foot at night before being collected by trucks for transport to the Thermopylae Line.

At Pinios Gorge, 21st Battalion had linked up with Australian forces and carried out a delaying action to cover the withdrawal of the rest of the 2nd New Zealand Division as well as the Australian 6th Division; however, the commander, Lieutenant Colonel Neil Macky misjudged the deployment of his defences and did not adequately cover the road through the gorge. On 18 April German tanks forced a passage through the gorge using the road. In the face of the advancing armour, his battalion fragmented and retreated. This put pressure on the Australian defence which in turn collapsed. It was only through artillery cover that the advance of the Germans was sufficiently slowed to allow the rest of the Allied forces to evacuate the line. (Note: Freyberg later dismissed Macky as a battalion commander in the 2NZEF.)

At the Thermopylae Line, the 5th Brigade, together with the 6th Brigade, guarded the Brallos Pass, a key route to Athens. Here they were prepared to hold to the "last man, last round." However, on 22 April, as the German forces approached the pass, the 2nd New Zealand Division was ordered to retreat. While the 4th and 6th Brigades provided cover, the 5th Brigade, minus a small number of platoons detached to the 6th Brigade, moved to beaches at Porti Rafti over the next two days and was evacuated to Crete in the evening of 24 April.

=== Crete ===
The 5th Brigade, the first of the New Zealand elements to arrive, disembarked on Crete on 25 April 1941 and Hargest was instructed to take over the defences to the west of the main town, Chania. By this time, what was left of 21st Battalion had rejoined the brigade. It was expected that Crete would be attacked by airborne troops as well as forces delivered by sea and Freyberg took command of Allied forces on the island. His garrison included the 4th and 5th Brigades of his own division, (Note: Parts of the 6th Brigade had been transported directly to Egypt and those on Crete soon joined them without taking part in the defence of Crete.) five Australian infantry battalions, a British brigade, a Royal Marine defence force, and a largely untrained Greek division.

Defence of Crete's Maleme airfield was assigned to the 5th Brigade, which was ordered to hold it at all cost. The 22nd Battalion was sited on Point 107, a hill overlooking the airfield. The other two battalions were positioned to the east, with the 21st Battalion initially tasked with a counterattack role, but this was transferred to the 23rd Battalion, which was in better condition after the fighting in Greece. Hargest's headquarters was to the rear at Platanias, some 7 km from the airfield, with the 28th Battalion nearby as the brigade reserve. On 19th May GHO in Cairo warned Freyberg that the Germans were coming the next day, and the whole garrison was put on high alert. 22nd Battalion was subjected to a heavy Luftwaffe raid which wounded the Commander Lieutenant Colonel Lesie Andrew, a veteran of the World War I, said it was worse than the artillery bombardments of Passcendale and the Somme, then at 7:00 am one company of glider troops from I/LLSR landed on the southern slope of Hill 107 and was shot to pieces, while the other company glided in along the Tavronitis river bed and captured the bridge and attacked the Western perimeter of Maleme Airfield held by company D and C of 22nd Battalion, Andrew held on until nightfall when the signal wires were cut to his command bunker on Hill 107, Andrew thought this was a signal that Company C and D were overrun, so withdrew at 9:00 pm after sending out runners with orders to retreat, the other 2 companies withdrew in the morning at 4:50 am after they found themselves all along at Maleme airfield then the next morning the surprised Fallshrimjager occupied Maleme airfield and soon after reinforcements of Alpinejagers were flown in, which turned the tide in the Axis favour.

Lieutenant Colonel Andrew has been criticised by many including in the Official History of New Zealand in the Second World War 1939–45, edited by Brigadier Kippenberger, who suggested Andrew should have fought to the last man defending hill 107.

== Notes ==
Footnotes

Citations
