= 21st Battalion (New Zealand) =

Infantry battalion of the New Zealand Military Forces during the Second World War

- Active: 1939–45
- Country: New Zealand
- Branch: New Zealand Military Forces
- Type: Infantry
- Size: ~700–900 personnel
- Part of: 5th Brigade, 2nd New Zealand Division
- Engagements: Second World War Battle of Greece Battle of Crete North African Campaign: Operation Crusader; First Battle of El Alamein; Italian Campaign: Battle of Monte Cassino

Commanders
- Notable commanders: Neil Macky; John Allen

The 21st Battalion was an infantry battalion of the New Zealand Military Forces that served during the Second World War. Formed in January 1940, it was part of the 5th Brigade, 2nd New Zealand Division of the 2nd New Zealand Expeditionary Force. The battalion saw action in Greece, Crete, North Africa and Italy before it was disbanded in December 1945.

== Formation ==
Following the outbreak of the Second World War, the New Zealand government authorised the formation of the 2nd New Zealand Expeditionary Force (2NZEF), for service at home and abroad. Following consultation with the British government, it was decided that the main New Zealand contribution to the war effort would be in the form of an infantry division, the 2nd New Zealand Division, under the command of Major General Bernard Freyberg. The new division would require nine battalions of infantry and consequently, several infantry battalions were formed from 1939 to 1940 with New Zealand volunteers.

The 21st Battalion (Note: The numbering of the battalions raised for the 2NZEF followed that of the existing 17 infantry battalions of the Territorial Force. The 21st Battalion was the fourth such unit of the 2NZEF, preceded by the 18th, 19th and 20th Battalions.) was formed in January 1940 at Papakura Military Camp, south of Auckland, and was the first of three infantry battalions designated to make up the 5th Infantry Brigade, the second echelon of the 2nd New Zealand Division. (Note: The other two infantry battalions were the 22nd and 23rd.) Under the command of Lieutenant Colonel Neil Macky, a veteran of the First World War, its personnel were all volunteers who were drawn from the Auckland, Hauraki, Northland and Waikato districts. Higher command had directed that training be limited to platoon activities but Macky, like most of the other battalion commanders of the brigade, focused the battalion's efforts on weaponry and field craft. He even managed to organise battalion level operations with Divisional Cavalry and engineering units.

By April 1940, training had been completed and 21st Battalion was preparing to depart overseas. It duly embarked aboard the Empress of Japan on 2 May 1940 and travelled in convoy with other troopships to Scotland with its first port call at Perth. The next stop would have been at Ceylon as the convoy travelled on towards its planned destination of the Middle East, but the invasion of Holland and France, followed by the entry of Italy into the war on the side of the Germans, forced a diversion. The convoy was now to make for England and thus it stopped at Cape Town, and then Freetown, arriving at Gourock, in Scotland, on 16 June.

== Greece ==
The British Government anticipated an invasion of Greece by the Germans in 1941 and decided to send troops to support the Greeks, who were already engaged against the Italians in Albania. The 2nd New Zealand Division was one of a number of Allied units dispatched to Greece in early March. By late March, 21st Battalion had arrived in Athens where it was to carry out guard duty of vital installations around the city while the rest of the division proceeded to the north of the country to garrison the Aliakmon line. On 6 April, the day after Germany declared war on Greece, elements of the battalion guarding docks near Athens experienced a bombing raid which caused minor wounds to a couple of men. On 8 April, the battalion began moving to the front to rejoin 5th Infantry Brigade, which was now stationed at Olympus Pass. However, en route the battalion was diverted to the Platamon Tunnel, which was 15 miles from the town of Larisa. The defences here had been prepared by D Company, of 26th Battalion. Orders were to hold the position and should any part of it be lost, a counterattack was to be immediately made. The battalion, which arrived on 9 April, set to work further improving the defences, assisted for three days by the company from 26th Battalion until its departure.

From 14 April, the 21st Battalion fended off a series of attacks by elements of the 2nd Panzer Division attempting to flank the 2nd New Zealand Division. The battalion held off several infantry attacks before withdrawing on 16 April to Pinios Gorge, having delayed the advance by 36 hours. At Pinios Gorge, 21st Battalion linked up with Australian forces and carried out a delaying action to cover the withdrawal of the rest of the 2nd New Zealand Division as well as the Australian 6th Division; however Macky misjudged the deployment of his defences and did not adequately cover the road through the gorge. On 18 April German tanks forced a passage through the gorge using the road. In the face of the advancing armour, his battalion fragmented and retreated. This put pressure on the Australian defence which in turn collapsed. It was only through artillery cover that the advance of the Germans was sufficiently slowed to allow the rest of the Allied forces to evacuate and shift to the Thermopylae Line.

As the German forces approached the Thermopylae Line, the 2nd New Zealand Division was ordered to retreat. While 4th and 6th Brigades provided cover, most of the 5th Brigade moved to beaches at Porti Rafti over the next two days and was evacuated to Crete in the evening of 24 April. Casualties during the 21st Battalion's campaign in Greece amounted to 40 killed and wounded with 230 personnel captured and made prisoners of war.

== Crete ==
The Glengyle arrived at Crete on 25 April and 21st Battalion were unloaded at Suda Bay. Initially it was believed that Crete was to simply be a staging point for the New Zealanders as they returned to Egypt. However, as military intelligence indicated a likely attack by the Germans, it was necessary to defend the island. The 5th Brigade was assigned the defence of Maleme airfield, with 21st Battalion positioned to the east, guarding the beach and river mouth. It was also tasked with supporting 22nd Battalion if required. At this time, the battalion numbered 237 personnel, and two companies of New Zealand Engineers were attached to boost its numbers. In early May several parties of men, including Macky, began arriving, having made their way to Crete from Greece by various means. However Macky was ill with dysentery and was soon taken to hospital, leaving Harding still as acting commander. Macky was soon sent back to Egypt on account of his performance in Greece, and Lieutenant Colonel John Allen took command of the battalion.

On 20 May 1941, German paratroopers began landing on Crete. After the initial drop, during which several Germans were killed as they descended, the day passed relatively uneventfully for the battalion. After the Maleme airfield, the defence of which was tasked to 22nd Battalion, was lost to the Germans, the entire 5th Brigade was withdrawn from its positions.

It was evacuated from Crete on the night of 31 May aboard the light cruiser HMS Phoebe and reached Alexandria the following day. Total casualties during the Battle of Crete were 33 killed in action, 33 wounded, and 80 men were captured.

== North Africa ==
After a period of leave, the battalion's personnel reassembled at Helwan in Egypt. Reduced to about 270 men after the campaigns in Greece and Crete, it was brought back up to strength with over 500 reinforcements. By August, the battalion, along with the rest of 5th Brigade, was involved in training in desert warfare and by the end of the month construction, of defensive positions, known as the Kaponga Box, commenced. It remained here for a month before shifting further west to the Baggush Box.

Its training was in preparation for the 2nd New Zealand Division's role in the upcoming Operation Crusader, which was planned to lift the siege of Tobruk. The New Zealanders were to be one of the 8th Army's infantry divisions that were to surround and capture the main strong points along the front while the armoured divisions were to seek out and engage Generalleutnant (Lieutenant General) Erwin Rommel's Afrika Korps. At the same time, the Tobruk garrison was to attempt a breakout.

== Commanding officers ==
The following officers served as commanding officer of 21st Battalion:

- Lieutenant Colonel N. L. Macky (January 1940–April 1941; May 1941);
- Major E. A. Harding (April–May 1941);
- Lieutenant Colonel J. M. Allen (May–November 1941);
- Major T. V. Fitzpatrick (November–December 1941);
- Lieutenant Colonel R. W. Harding (December 1941; May–June 1942; July 1942–April 1943; May–June 1943) (Note: Harding had the rank of major during his first two periods in command of the battalion.)
- Lieutenant Colonel S. F. Allen (December 1941–May 1942; June–July 1942);
- Lieutenant Colonel H. M. McElroy (July 1942; June 1943–June 1944) (Note: McElroy had the rank of major during his first period in command of the battalion.);
- Lieutenant Colonel M. C. Fairbrother (April–May 1943);
- Lieutenant Colonel A. C. Trousdale (June–July 1944);
- Lieutenant Colonel J. I. Thodey (July–October 1944; May–December 1945;
- Lieutenant Colonel E. A. McPhail (October 1944–May 1945).

== Notes ==
Footnotes

Citations
