= 22nd Battalion (New Zealand) =

WW2 New Zealand Army unit

- Active: 1939–48
- Country: New Zealand
- Branch: New Zealand Military Forces
- Type: Infantry
- Size: ~700–900 personnel
- Part of: 5th Brigade, 2nd Division
- Mottos: Vrai et fort, Second to none
- Engagements: Second World War: Battle of Greece; Battle of Crete; Operation Crusader; First Battle of El Alamein; Second Battle of El Alamein; Moro River Campaign; Battle of Monte Cassino; Gothic Line; Spring 1945 offensive in Italy

Commanders
- Notable commanders: Leslie Andrew; Haddon Donald

The 22nd Battalion, also known as the "Wellington Battalion", was an infantry battalion of the New Zealand Military Forces, which served during the Second World War. After undertaking defensive duties in the United Kingdom from mid-1940 until early 1941, the battalion then fought in the Battles of Greece and Crete where it suffered heavy casualties and lost a large number of men who were taken as prisoners of war. After being rebuilt, the battalion fought in North Africa, fighting in Operation Crusader, before undertaking garrison duties in Syria. It later fought in the First Battle of El Alamein during which they suffered heavy casualties at Ruweisat Ridge. Re-formed, the battalion later fought in the Second Battle of El Alamein. In late 1943, the battalion was transferred to Italy where it fought for the remainder of the war, fighting battles around Cassino and along the Adriatic coast, before entering Trieste in the final days of the war. After the war, it performed occupation duties in Japan until it was disbanded in 1948.

== History ==
=== Formation and garrison duty in the United Kingdom ===
The 22nd Battalion was formed at Trentham Camp in November 1939, as one of several battalions raised for service overseas as part of the 2nd New Zealand Expeditionary Force. The first parade was held in mid-January 1940, when the battalion's four rifle companies – 'A' through to 'D' – were formed. The majority of its personnel were drawn from the Wellington region, with recruits coming from Wellington; the west coast, Hawke's Bay, Wairarapa and Taranaki. The battalion's first commander was Lieutenant Colonel Leslie Andrew, a Victoria Cross recipient from the First World War. He trained his new command hard and quickly earned the nickname of "February" due to his habit of issuing 28-day detentions for any breaches in discipline.

After completing rudimentary training, the battalion embarked for England in May 1940 as part of the 5th Infantry Brigade, 2nd New Zealand Division. Sailing on the transport Empress of Britain, they made port calls at Perth, in Australia, Cape Town, and Freetown before arriving at Gourock, in Scotland, in June. Following this, the battalion spent the remainder of the year on garrison duties in the south of England where they were positioned to respond in case of a cross-Channel invasion by the Germans in the wake of the Fall of France.

=== Greece and Crete ===
In March 1941, as the threat of invasion passed, the battalion was transferred to Egypt and then, after just three weeks, onto Greece, which was already engaged against the Italians in Albania, and where a German attack was expected. Arriving in Athens in early April on board the Hellas, the 22nd Battalion deployed forward to Katerini initially, but just after the German invasion of Greece it was pulled back to the Olympus Pass, where the 5th Brigade established blocking positions. The subsequent fighting was short and the battalion saw little action as the Allied force was quickly pushed back and evacuated by sea around the end of April. Despite the confusion of the evacuation, the battalion managed to keep most of its stores and equipment, although several vitally important radio set were abandoned due to conflicting orders.

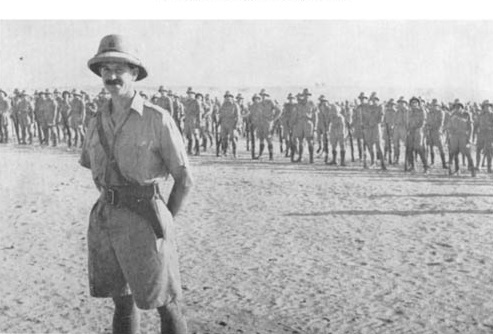
Lieutenant Colonel Les Andrew and the battalion at Helwan, July 1941, after returning from Crete

Evacuated to Crete, the 22nd Battalion was pressed into the defence of the strategically important island which sat on a vital sea lane of communication across the Mediterranean. On 20 May 1941, the Germans launched an airborne invasion of the island, and during the subsequent Battle of Crete the 22nd Battalion was tasked with the defence of Maleme airfield and the overlooking hill, Point 107. Forced to disperse the companies of his battalion widely to cover his positions, Andrew lost contact with most of his units after German paratroopers began landing in the area on 20 May. Failing to receive any support from his brigade commander following a request for assistance, and fearing most of his command overrun after a failed counterattack by his small reserve, he withdrew his remaining units. As it happened, most of his forward companies remained intact and were subsequently able to withdraw after finding they had been abandoned. Andrew was criticised for his withdrawal, which led to the loss of Maleme airfield. This was a significant factor in allowing the German forces to become established on Crete. He and the surviving elements of his battalion were later evacuated from the island.

=== North Africa, Syria and Italy ===
After the battalion's experience on Crete, in June 1941 it was reconstituted at Garawi, a camp outside Alexandria, where a batch of 365 reinforcements arrived from New Zealand to bring it back up to full strength. After a period of training to ease the new arrivals into the battalion, they moved to Kabrit where the rest of the 5th Brigade began more complex collective training. After this, they were sent to the Kaponga Box for a period to undertake garrison duties and construction tasks, before undertaking manoeuvres with the rest of the 2nd New Zealand Division around Baggush in October in preparation for their deployment to Libya as part of Operation Crusader, which began in mid-November. After taking part in the fighting in the Western Desert, the 22nd Battalion was withdrawn to Kabrit where it received a batch of 200 reinforcements to replace its losses in Libya, and undertook further training.

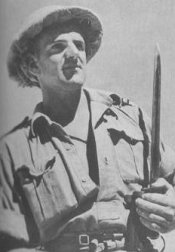
Keith Elliott, who received the Victoria Cross for his actions commanding a platoon from the 22nd Battalion during the disastrous Ruweisat Ridge action

In April 1942, the battalion was deployed to Syria along with the rest of the 2nd New Zealand Division, where they formed part of the Allied garrison that had been established there at the conclusion of the Syria–Lebanon campaign. Occupying positions at Alfrine, near Aleppo, the battalion was tasked with constructing defences and garrisoning the area in order to deter an attack through Turkey into Syria. They remained there until June 1942, when the New Zealanders were moved back to Egypt following German successes in the Western Desert. They subsequently took part in the fighting in the First Battle of El Alamein, including a disastrous action at Ruweisat Ridge where, after their anti-tank guns had been knocked out, over 350 members of the battalion were taken prisoner after being surrounded by German armour. Following these heavy losses, the battalion was reconstituted at Maadi, before returning to the line, rejoining the rest of the 2nd New Zealand Division around Ruweisat in late August 1942; during this time the battalion was briefly detached to the British 132nd Brigade, before returning to the 5th New Zealand Brigade at the start of September. It subsequently took part in the Second Battle of El Alamein before being withdrawn back to Maadi in November 1942.

At Maadi, the battalion was converted to a motor role – the only motorised battalion in the 2nd New Zealand Division – receiving extra Bren carriers and machine guns for its final campaign of the war: Italy. It was also reorganised at this time, with the four rifle companies being replaced by three numerically designated motor companies, although ultimately, the Italian terrain negated much of the battalion's mobility.

Embarking in mid-October 1943, the battalion subsequently fought in a number of battles as it crossed the Sangro River and fought around Cassino, before advancing towards Florence and then up the Adriatic coast. In the final months of the war, the division advanced steadily, pushing over the Senio and then the Santerno Rivers towards the Alps, before being placed into reserve in April 1945 as the Allies pushed towards the Po River. In late April, the 22nd Battalion became the 5th Brigade's main effort, leading the advance towards the Piave River, where they found that all bridges had been destroyed. Improvising, the battalion pressed a local ferry into operation and after establishing a bridgehead on the other side of the river, continued the advance towards Trieste, fighting its final actions of the war against the Germans around Miramare. The battalion lost its final casualties when one of its companies was fired upon by Yugoslav partisans near Opicina after the end of hostilities.

The battalion's casualties during the war amounted to 282 men killed in action or died of wounds, 799 wounded and 511 captured as prisoners of war. In the aftermath, the battalion remained in Trieste to counter the presence of Yugoslav partisans until June 1945 before being withdrawn to Perugia and then wintering in a camp near Florence.

=== Occupation duties in Japan ===
After the war, the 22nd Battalion formed part of Jayforce, New Zealand's contribution to the British Commonwealth Occupation Force in Japan. Arriving on 22 March 1946, the battalion was assigned to the Yamaguchi province in southern Honshu. While deployed to Japan, the battalion was redesignated as the "2nd Battalion, Royal New Zealand Infantry Regiment" on 7 August 1947. The battalion was disbanded in 1948.

== Honours ==
Sergeant Keith Elliott was the 22nd Battalion's sole Victoria Cross recipient during the Second World War, receiving the award for actions around Ruweisat, Egypt, on 15 July 1942. Other decorations bestowed upon members of the 22nd Battalion included two Distinguished Service Orders, seven Distinguished Conduct Medals, one Member of the Order of the British Empire, 12 Military Crosses and one bar, 14 Military Medals and one Greek Military Cross.

== Commanding officers ==
The following officers served as commanding officer of the 22nd Battalion:

- Lieutenant Colonel L. W. Andrew (January 1940 – February 1942); (Note: Andrew later achieved the rank of brigadier.)
- Lieutenant Colonel J. T. Russell (February 1942 – September 1942);
- Lieutenant Colonel T. C. Campbell (September 1942 – April 1944);
- Lieutenant Colonel D. G. Steele (April–May 1944);
- Lieutenant Colonel H. V. Donald (May–November 1944; March–August 1945);
- Lieutenant Colonel A. W. F. O'Reilly (November 1944 – March 1945);
- Major R. H. Spicer (August–October 1945);
- Lieutenant Colonel W. B. Thomas (October 1945 – November 1946);
- Lieutenant Colonel G. M. McCaskill (November 1946 – August 1947).

== Notes ==
Footnotes

Citations
