= 6th Infantry Brigade (New Zealand) =

Infantry battalion of the New Zealand Military Forces during the Second World War

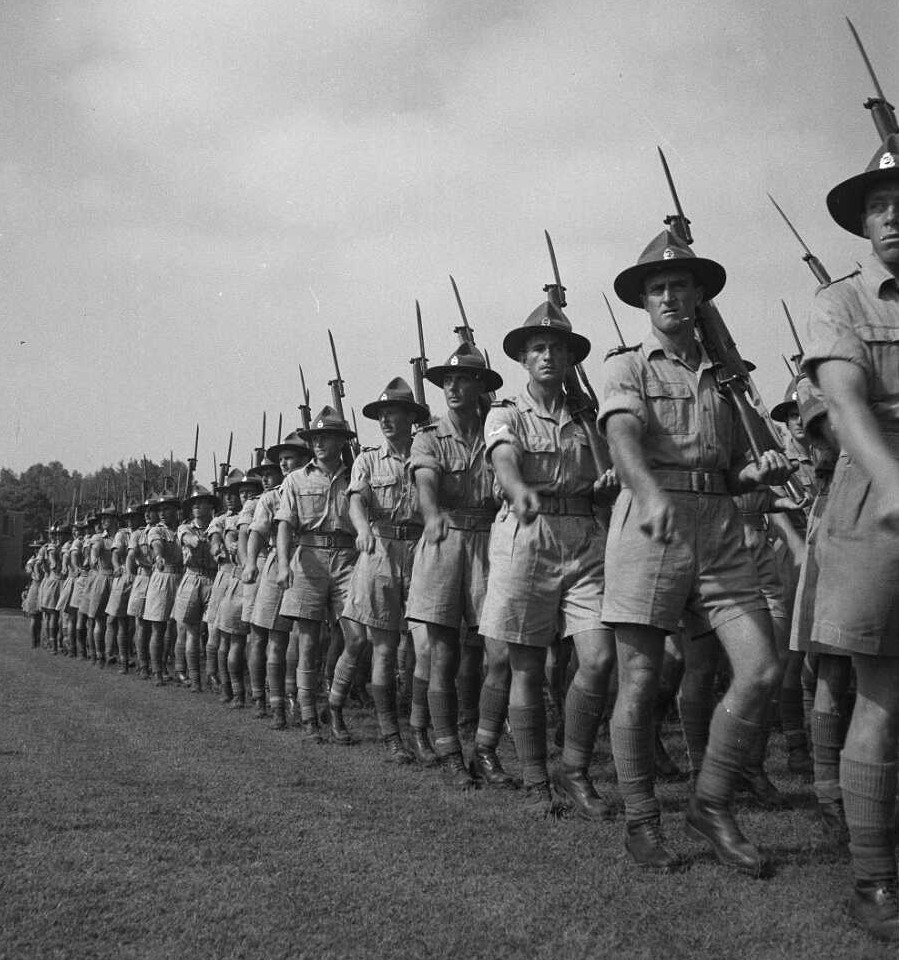
- 6th Brigade on parade at Maadi camp, Egypt, August 1943
- Active: 1940–45
- Country: New Zealand
- Branch: New Zealand Military Forces
- Type: Infantry
- Size: Brigade
- Part of: 2nd New Zealand Division
- Engagements: World War II: North African Campaign; Italian Campaign

Commanders
- Notable commanders: Harold Barrowclough; George Clifton; William Gentry; Graham Parkinson

The 6th Infantry Brigade was an infantry brigade of the New Zealand Military Forces, active during World War II as part of the 2nd New Zealand Division. It saw service during the North African Campaign and the Italian Campaign before being disbanded in late 1945.

== History ==
The 6th Infantry Brigade was intended to be the last of the three echelons of the 2nd New Zealand Division, commanded by Major General Bernard Freyberg. The first two echelons had already departed New Zealand for the Middle East when the 6th Infantry Brigade was formed in May 1940. However, the officers and non-commissioned officers of the brigade had received their training with the 5th Infantry Brigade, the second echelon of the division. Brigadier Harold Barrowclough, who was then in England where the second echelon had been diverted while in transit, was appointed commander of the brigade. The 6th Brigade consisted of three infantry battalions, these being the 24th (with men drawn from the Northern Military District), the 25th (Central Military District), and the 26th (Southern Military District).

There had been some initial reluctance by the New Zealand government to allow the departure of the brigade. There were fears that the Japanese Empire had hostile intentions towards British Commonwealth possessions in the Pacific and the brigade represented trained and equipped manpower that could be used in home defence. In the end, it was decided to retain a contingent of reinforcements intended for the first and second echelons for defence purposes in the Pacific. The brigade itself left for the Middle East in August 1940, and arrived in Egypt by the end of September. The 6th Brigade was located at the division's Maadi Camp where it would undergo training while the other major component of the division already in Egypt, the 4th Infantry Brigade, was on garrison duty in the Baggush Box.

=== Greece ===
The start of the Greece campaign marked the division's first offensive operations as a complete formation. Sent to Greece alongside the Australian 6th Division and a British armoured brigade in order to support the Greeks in their defence against an expected invasion by the Germans, the New Zealanders manned the Aliakmon Line, with the 6th Brigade deployed on the eastern end of the line, near the coast. Arriving in early March, it busied itself with preparation of its defensive positions for the next several days. For a time, 26th Battalion was detached to help prepare defensive positions for 5th Brigade, still in transit, around Olympus Pass.

The Germans began their invasion of Greece on 6 April and within a few days, the Aliakmon Line was abandoned with the brigade being withdrawn to Olympus Pass and into a series of rearguard actions. Soon it was decided to evacuate the Allied forces and 6th Brigade covered the early stages of the withdrawal. At this stage, the brigade was located near Monemvasia along with British and Australian personnel. The brigade duly embarked from Monemvasia on 29 April on the Royal Navy cruiser HMS Ajax and four destroyers, with the 24th Battalion acting as the rearguard for the evacuation. The ships arrived later that day off Crete. While the 4th and 5th Brigades were to remain on Crete, the 6th was transferred to a pair of transports which went onto Egypt, arriving on 2 May. It would play no role in the Battle of Crete.

=== North Africa ===
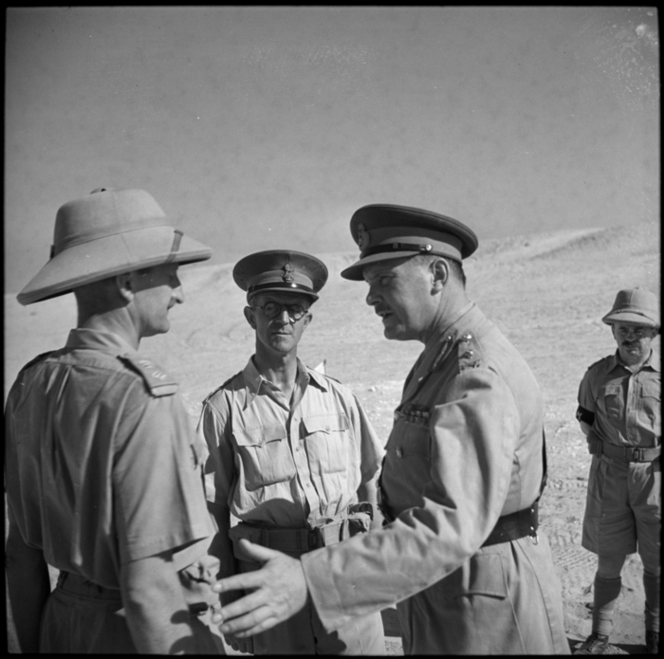
Major General Bernard Freyberg (centre right), arriving to conduct a review of 6th Brigade, is greeted by its commander, Brigadier Harold Barrowclough (centre left), September 1941.

Following the Battle of Crete, the remaining elements of the division were evacuated to Egypt where they would meet up the 6th Infantry Brigade for refitting and resupply. Many units were heavily depleted but reinforcements from New Zealand bring them up to strength and training is resumed after a week of "survivor's leave."

While the New Zealanders were fighting in the Greece and Crete campaigns, the situation in North Africa had significantly changed with the entry of the Afrika Korps into the theatre of operations in order to aid the Italians there. British forces were pushed out of Cyrenaica and the German and Italian forces advanced and laid siege to Tobruk, held by the Australian 9th Division. The 2nd New Zealand Division was attached to XIII Corps, part of the British Eighth Army, and designated to participate in Operation Crusader. This operation was intended to lift the Siege of Tobruk.

The 2nd New Zealand Division moved into Libya on the night of 18 November and began its contribution to the offensive three days later. The 6th Brigade was initially brought up the rear while 4th and 5th Brigades advanced on 21 November. The former targeted the Bardia–Tobruk highway and while the latter the area around Bardia and Sollum. The 6th Brigade, as planned, was detached to XXX Corps and sent to Sidi Rezegh to provide infantry support to the armoured units there. The brigade moved to Bir el Hariga with the 25th Battalion leading alongside the 24th Battalion. However, the following day the situation at Sidi Rezegh had deteriorated, and 6th Brigade was ordered to advance to Point 175, set up a perimeter and then make contact with the 5th South African Brigade, which was in some difficulty, at Sidi Rezegh. Leaving early in the morning of 23 November, the 25th and 26th Battalions led the advance. At daybreak, they stopped and bivouacked in a wadi. Elements of the Afrika Korps, later discovered to be its headquarters unit, moved into the wadi from the far end and this initiated a battle in which several prisoners were taken. General Ludwig Crüwell, commander of the Afrika Korps, only just avoided capture but vital papers and communication equipment was captured or destroyed.

The 6th Brigade moved on quickly to take Point 175 as soon as possible. Point 175 marked the start of the Sidi Rezegh escarpment, 40 kilometres (25 mi) from Tobruk. Arriving a few hours after their initial contact with the enemy earlier in the morning, the 25th Battalion made its first attempt to capture the feature, having received orders to do so from Barrowclough. Initial impressions that Point 175 was only lightly defended proved incorrect and it was found that the position was held by the 361st Afrika Regiment. The attack needed additional support with two companies of the 24th Battalion and a squadron of Valentine tanks from 8th Royal Tank Regiment called upon to assist. After initially proceeding well, a German counterattack caused significant casualties amongst the battalion and the remaining two companies of the 24th Battalion moved forward that evening to help secure the little ground that had been won. In the meantime, 26th Battalion was sent forward to link up with the South Africans. However, unable to prevent the South Africans from being overrun by German forces, the battalion itself has to fend off attacks and withdrew to Sidi Rezegh.

The 4th Brigade moved to link up with the 6th Brigade and, with its support, continued to work towards the capture of Sidi Rezegh. On 27 November, the 6th Brigade fought a fierce battle with a battalion of the 9th Bersaglieri Regiment and by the end of the day all of Sidi Rezegh was under the control of the New Zealanders. However, the 25th Battalion was at little more than company strength following the events of 23 November and there had been heavy casualties in the other battalions including 21st Battalion, which had been detached from 5th Brigade and placed under Barrowclough's command. In the meantime, 4th Brigade had moved on and managed to link up with the British 32nd Army Tank Brigade at El Duda. This established a small bridgehead on the Tobruk front but this was to last for just five days.

Rommel had inflicted a significant defeat on the British armour and was now returning to the Tobruk area. The 6th Brigade was strung out along Sidi Rezegh in pockets, vulnerable to a counter-attack, and elements of the 15th Panzer Division made contact on 28 November. By 30 November, 6th Brigade was surrounded and after midday the Italian Ariete Division and 15th Panzer Division began attacking with tanks and infantry. Despite the support of anti-tank guns, both 24th and 26th Battalions were overrun. The survivors, and what remained of 25th Battalion, managed to withdraw before Sidi Rezegh was overrun.

From late February to mid-March 1942, the 2nd New Zealand Division was transferred to Syria. The Allied high command was concerned that the Middle East was at risk from an invasion by the Germans and the New Zealanders were tasked with blocking their likely route from the Caucasus. Following the attack on the British Eighth Army's Gazala Line by Panzer Army Africa, the 2nd New Zealand Division was recalled to Egypt. By the end of June, the brigade, was setting up camp in the Alamein area.

==== Egypt ====
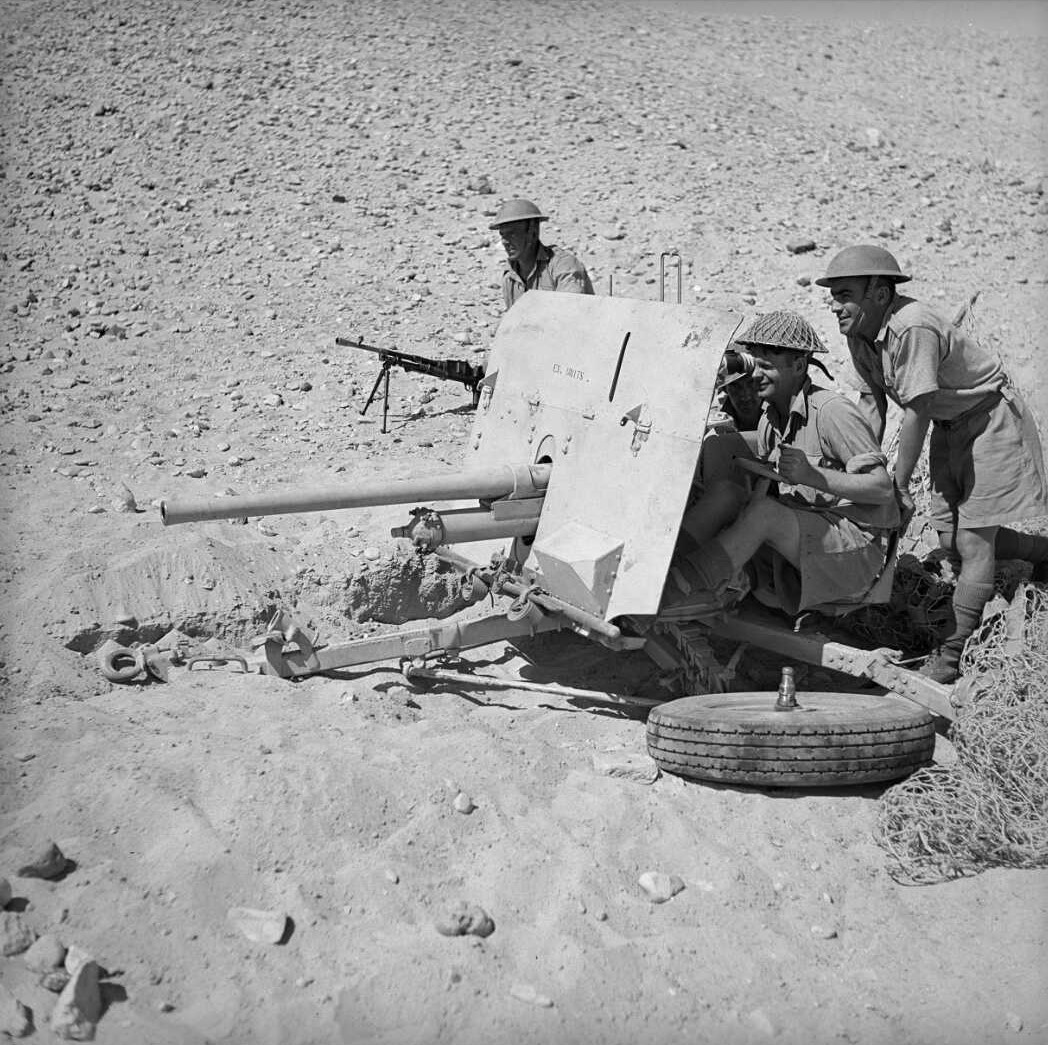
A 2-pounder antitank gun in position, probably during 6th Infantry Brigade manoeuvres at El Saff, Egypt.

The 2nd New Zealand Division was dispatched to the lines of El Alamein and while the 4th and 5th Brigades went south to Minqar Qaim, the 6th Brigade, now commanded by Brigadier George Clifton, (Note: Barrowclough had left for New Zealand in early 1942 after being selected to command the Pacific Section of the 2NZEF.) was initially held in reserve before being ordered to man the Kaponga Box at Bab el Qattara. Arriving on 28 June, the 25th Battalion guarded the western side of the box, while the 24th and 26th Battalions were responsible for the northern and southern sides respectively. The brigade remained here, watching first the retreating British stream by and then the Germans, at a distance, for several days before moving to Amiriya. It missed the action of 14–15 July at Ruweisat Ridge which saw the destruction of a large part of the 4th and 5th Brigades when, after securing the ridge, no armour was available to defend a counterattack by the Germans. The 6th Brigade was recalled to the El Alamein lines to relieve what was left of the 4th Brigade. A few days later, it was involved in a nighttime attack on the El Mrier Depression. The aim was to secure the depression to create a route through which British armour could penetrate. The brigade, with the 25th Battalion as its reserve, successfully achieved its objective, although with some losses to 24th Battation, and was consolidating its positions when the 21st Panzer Division attacked on 22 July.

At daylight, the tanks of the 21st Panzer Division caught the headquarters of 6th Brigade, which along with 24th and 25th Battalions (the latter having moved up during the night), was positioned in the relatively shallow El Mrier Depression. Firing from the edge of a low cliff overlooking the depression, the Germans caused heavy losses amongst the infantry battalions before passing through their positions in pursuit of the British armour. Over 900 men were either killed, wounded, or captured including the majority of 24th Battalion and half of the 25th Battalion. Clifton, with his brigade headquarters, had been among those captured but managed to escape. What remained of 6th Brigade moved to the southern section of the Alamein line where it manned defensive positions during the Battle of Alam Halfa, Rommel's failed attempt to cut off the Eighth Army. On the night of 3 September, the brigade's 26th Battalion, the strongest of the brigade after the action of 22 July, along with 5th Brigade and the British 132nd Infantry Brigade, (Note: The 4th Brigade had been badly mauled on 22 July and was withdrawn for conversion to armour shortly afterwards.) made a nighttime attack. Although 5th Brigade fared relatively well and gained its objectives, the commander of 26th Battalion was killed and his successor, along with Clifton, became a prisoner of war.

On 8 September, the 2nd New Zealand Division started withdrawing from the front for a rest. The British Eighth Army was now under the command of Lieutenant-General Bernard Montgomery, who was planning for offensive operations against the Panzer Army Africa, which had formed a defensive position at Alamein. A reinforced 2nd New Zealand Division, with Brigadier William Gentry in command of 6th Brigade, was to play a major role in the forthcoming attack. The first of its three phases began on 23 October, with the New Zealanders advancing behind a creeping artillery barrage that commenced at 9:40 pm. The division quickly attained all its objectives and began consolidating them.

The 2nd New Zealand Division was withdrawn four days later, with the Australian 9th Division taking up the offensive in the northern section of the front. The New Zealanders, along with two British infantry brigades, resumed the fight on 2 November in Operation Supercharge, which was intended to break the frontlines in the south. The German defences collapsed and on 4 November they began retreating with the 2nd New Zealand Division in pursuit. The 6th Brigade, with the British 9th Armoured Brigade temporarily attached in support, led the initial advance. However, rain turned the ground boggy and halted the move forward temporarily before it could resume on 8 November. In mid-November, the division was withdrawn for rest and re-organisation.

==== Advance into Libya and Tunisia ====
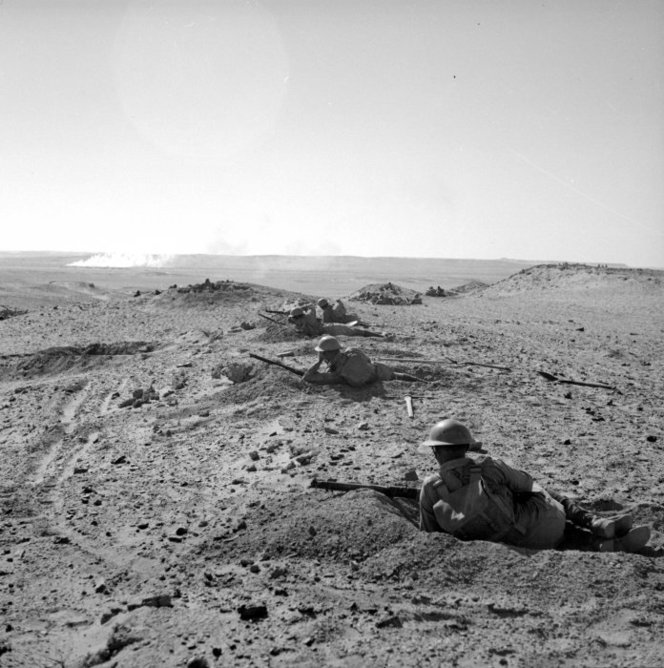
Personnel of 6th Infantry Brigade during manoeuvres in Egypt.

The 2nd New Zealand Division, after a month of reorganisation and training at Sidi Azeiz, re-entered the campaign in mid-December at El Agheila in an attempt to trap the Afrika Korps. On 11 December, the 6th Brigade led the division in a flanking move to the south and west, which was unopposed for five days. On the evening of 15 December, a reconnaissance element that included the brigade commander, Gentry, came under fire from a ridge. The 24th and 25th Battalions attacked the ridge in an attempt to trap the Germans but this failed, with the enemy slipping through the gap between the 5th and 6th Brigades. A second attempt to trap the Germans was made at Nofilia a few days later but this also failed when the rearguard prevented the 5th Brigade from closing the road along which the retreat was being made. The advance continued and on 23 January 1943, the division entered Tripoli. The brigade was initially stationed outside of Tripoli but moved into the city proper later in February as part of the occupying force.

In the meantime, the Afrika Korps had withdrawn to the Mareth Line in Tunisia and following a failed attack by the Germans on the 8th Army at Medenine in early March, the Allied response was for the New Zealanders, along with British and Free French forces, to drive forward to the Tebaga Gap south of the Mareth Line. On 21 March, the 6th Brigade mounted a nighttime attack on a feature known as Point 201, which was defended by Italian forces. The attack was on a two battalion frontage, with the 25th Battalion on the left and tasked with the capture of Point 201 itself, and the 26th Battalion making a corresponding movement forward. The objective was achieved with relatively few casualties but many more were incurred the following day due to artillery fire on the exposed Point 201. However, the breach that the attacking battalions made was not exploited by the supporting British armour.

The brigade's 24th Battalion was attached to the infantry of the 5th Brigade, along with a regiment of the British 8th Armoured Brigade in support for the next attempt to capture the Tebaga Gap on 27 March. The 25th Battalion also played a minor role, securing the extreme left flank, carrying out diversionary operations, and generally supporting the 24th Battalion during its advance. The attack was a total success and the next day the brigade moved forward with the 25th Battalion bringing up the rear.

Over the coming days, the 2nd New Zealand Division, which briefly halted its advance for a week for rest and maintenance of its vehicles, advanced towards the town of Enfidaville, over 80 miles (130 km) to the north. Only minor opposition was encountered as it moved forward and the outskirts of Enfidaville were reached on 14 April. Resistance prevented the infantry companies of 25th Battalion, leading 6th Brigade, from entering the town that day. Preparations for a full-scale attack on the town had begun but the brigade was relieved before they could be implemented. Focus then shifted to Takrouna, the 2nd New Zealand Division's objective in Operation Oration, X Corps' offensive towards Tunis. The 6th Brigade was to attack north of the Takrouna-Enfidaville road, flanking 5th Brigade's attack on Takrouna. The attack commenced on the evening of 19 April; while the 6th Brigade easily secured its objectives, the 5th Brigade struggled and it took two days for Takrouna to fall. The brigade remained on the frontlines to keep pressure on the enemy while other Allied units broke through to Tunis elsewhere on the front. In early May, the Axis forces in North Africa surrendered and the 2nd New Zealand Division began to return to Egypt.

=== Italy ===
With the close of the North African campaign in May 1943, the Allies' attention then turned to the European theatre of operations. Despite a preference amongst some sections of the New Zealand government for the 2nd New Zealand Division to be redeployed in the Pacific theatre, it was decided that the division, having served with the 8th Army throughout the desert campaign, would remain in Europe and take part in the fighting in Italy. Having been based in Maadi Camp since early June, the brigade left Egypt on 5 October to begin the division's shift to Italy. It reached Taranto three days later and over the following days, the division was re-assembled.

The brigade, along with the rest of the 2nd New Zealand Division, moved to the banks of the Sangro River early the following month and was scheduled to mount a night crossing on 21 November. Two companies of the 24th Battalion had crossed the previous night to reconnoiter the opposite bank but the attack was postponed due to bad weather. The brigade eventually forded the river on foot with the 25th Battalion in the centre, bracketed by the 26th on its left and the 24th on the right, on 27 November. Although briefly disturbed during the crossing by a German machinegun, there were no casualties, and the battalions of the brigade pushed forward and seized their objectives, a range of hills over 1,000 yards (910 m) beyond the river.

In the following weeks, the 6th Brigade was involved in attacks on the town of Orsogna, as part of the Moro River Campaign. The initial attack was launched by 25th Battalion on the evening of 2 December but without the use of supporting armour or artillery as the brigade's commander, Brigadier Graham Parkinson, did not anticipate any difficulty in taking the town. The leading platoons of the battalion penetrated into the town square but soon robust defence, supported by German tanks of the 26th Panzer Division, forced them back. Two platoons of infantry were captured. Two tank troops from the 18th Armoured Regiment were ordered forward but by the time they had reached the outskirts of Orsogna, the infantry were withdrawing from the town. Another attack, this time with armour and artillery support was carried out on 7 December by 24th Battalion, with two battalions of 5th Brigade in support. However, the tanks were unable to penetrate into the town and the attack petered out.

Further attacks on Orsogna were made by the 5th Brigade, with support from the battalions of the 6th Brigade, in the following days, but the German defences were too strong and the attack soon faded into a stalemate, with a number of back and forth actions as winter set in. Offensive operations around Orsogna ceased in late December and the 6th Brigade maintained its sector with two battalions, rotating the 24th, 25th and 26th Battalions out of the line in three-day spells. The New Zealanders withdrew from the area altogether on 13 January 1944.

==== Cassino ====
Following its withdrawal from the Orsogna area, the 2nd New Zealand Division was one of a number of divisions that were transferred from the 8th Army to the Fifth Army, then engaged on the western side of the Apennines. This was part of an overall strategy to breach the Gustav Line and break an otherwise deadlocked Italian front. Together with the 4th Indian Division and supporting British and American artillery, the division became part of the newly formed New Zealand Corps, under the command of Freyberg. Brigadier Howard Kippenberger took over command of the division in Freyberg's stead. The corps moved to Cassino, the defenders of which had resisted American forces for several weeks. In the interim, the brigade had rested for several days in the Volturno valley, 50 miles (80 km) from Cassino. During this time it received some reinforcements although these were not enough to bring it up to full strength.

In mid-February, the 2nd New Zealand Division was moved forward to the south of Cassino, taking over part of the sector of the United States 36th Division, with the 6th Brigade as divisional reserve. An initial attack on Cassino, which involved the 4th Indian Division, the 28th Maori Battalion and New Zealand engineers, was mounted on 15 February but failed due to a lack of air and armoured support. Two days later, the 5th Brigade attempted to capture the town's railway station but this too failed.

It was soon to be the 6th Brigade's turn. It moved out of its reserve positions and relieved the United States 133rd Infantry Regiment, positioned nearly 2 kilometres (1.2 mi) to the north of Cassino. The 24th and 25th Battalions manned the front lines, uncomfortably exposed to machinegun fire from an overlooking ridge. It was planned for the 6th Brigade to mount its attack on Cassino on 24 February but rainfall delayed it by over three weeks. When the brigade's attack finally commenced, on 15 March, the town had been thoroughly shelled and bombed during the intervening period. Supported by the 19th Armoured Regiment, all three of the brigade's infantry battalions pushed into Cassino. The 25th Battalion was tasked with capturing the western side of the town up to the Continental Hotel whereupon the 26th Battalion was to take up the advance. However, it was unable to achieve its objectives; the Germans defended strongly, assisted by the rubble that hampered the easy movement of the supporting armour. After spending 16 March consolidating what gains it had made, a further attempt was made the following day but this was again largely unsuccessful. After 10 days, Parkinson, temporarily in command of the 2nd New Zealand Division, withdrew the brigade. Its replacement, the 5th Brigade, was no more successful and was reduced to simply holding what ground had been gained amongst the rubble of Cassino.

On 26 March, the New Zealand Corps disbanded and Freyberg reverted to command of the division which, a few days later, began to disengage from Cassino. The 6th Brigade was withdrawn on 1 April and it was left to the Polish Corps to capture Cassino in mid-May. The New Zealanders were held in reserve until 9 July, having spent the intervening period recuperating in Avezzano, and assigned to XIII Corps. The infantry brigades advanced onto Florence and duly entered the city in August. After this, the division was transferred to the I Canadian Corps, then on the Adriatic Coast, and advanced up to Rimini.

During the advance, the brigade's 24th and 25th battalions were temporarily reorganised into two "Battalion Battle Groups", each of which included a squadron of Shermans from 20th Armoured Regiment, a platoon of machineguns and heavy mortars, and an anti-tank troop. These two battle groups alternated as the advance guard of 6th Brigade, which in turn led the division in a series of river crossings throughout September up to and beyond Rimini at which stage the 5th Brigade took over the advance while the 24th and 25th Battalions were placed in reserve for a rest. After a week, the brigade re-entered the frontlines in preparation for an assault across the Fiumicino River. The 24th and 26th Battalion, with the 25th in reserve, were to carry out the crossing but the weather delayed the attack. It was abandoned altogether when the Canadians took over the sector.

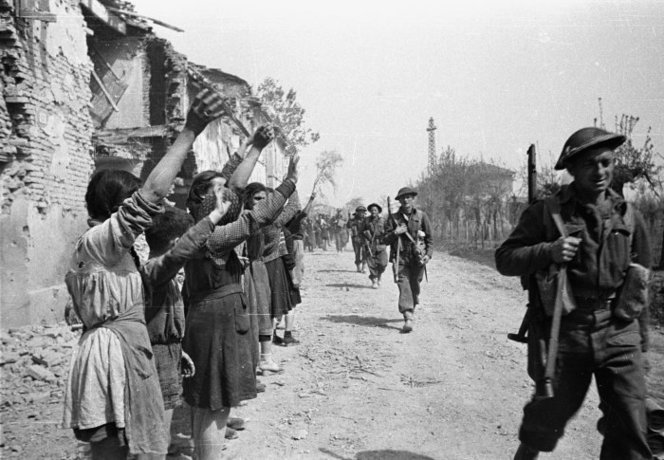
The infantry of the 25th Battalion march through the village of Barbiano, 10 April 1945

Later in October, the New Zealanders were relieved and sent to Fabriano for rest and recuperation. During this time, the division was reorganised, with each of the infantry brigades expanding from three to four battalions. It reentered the frontlines, near the town of Faenza, in late November, under V Corps. The following month, the brigade crossed the Lamone River and its infantry battalions were involved in attacks in and around Faenza. Along with the rest of the 2nd New Zealand Division, it then wintered along the Senio River, remaining there until March 1945.

==== Advance to Trieste ====
On 9 April, the 2nd New Zealand Division crossed the Senio River. The crossing was carried out by the 5th and 6th Infantry Brigades, with the 25th Battalion on the right of the 6th Brigade's frontage, alongside the 24th Battalion. A squadron of the 20th Armoured Regiment was in support, and the crossing itself was covered by artillery, fighter bombers, and flamethrowers and was achieved with minimal opposition. Despite suffering casualties due to being accidentally bombed by Allied bombers, 25th Battalion continued to lead the advance of the 6th Brigade to the Santerno, which it crossed on 11 April. Ordered to continue its advance to the Scolo Sillaro, the battalion established a bridgehead over which tanks were able to cross. It was relieved by the 23rd Battalion on 16 April, leaving the 25th Battalion as the reserve for the brigade. The advance continued, effectively unopposed, and the Po River was crossed with minimal difficulty on 25 April and the Adige River was traversed the next day, again with relative ease.

The 9th Infantry Brigade then took over the advance, with the 6th Brigade taking over as the divisional reserve. Although the war was nearly over, care was still required as the brigade moved forward through the towns of Padua and Gorizia, before the surrender of all German forces in Italy on 2 May.

Along with other elements of the 2nd New Zealand Division, 6th Brigade remained in and around Trieste for several weeks to counter the presence of the partisans, who had laid claim to the city. In mid-June the partisans withdrew from the city and several weeks later the New Zealand government decided that the division would not be required for service in the Pacific Theater of Operations. In early August, the division began demobilisation with long serving men leaving for New Zealand via Bari while the remaining personnel withdrew to wintering positions near Florence. In October, Lieutenant Colonel Barnett took over command of what was left of the 6th Brigade and oversaw its disbandment in December 1945.

== Notes ==
Footnotes

Citations
