= 20th Battalion (New Zealand) =

WW2 New Zealand Army unit

20th Battalion (20th Armoured Regiment)
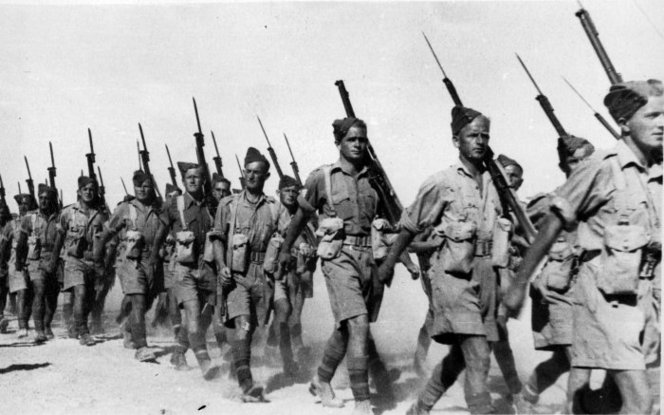
- Infantry of the 20th Battalion in Baggush, Egypt, September 1941
- Active: 1939–1945
- Disbanded: 2 December 1945
- Country: New Zealand
- Branch: New Zealand Military Forces
- Type: Infantry (1939–1942); Armoured (1943–1945)
- Size: c. 800 personnel
- Part of: 4th Brigade, 2nd New Zealand Division
- Engagements: Second World War Battle of Greece Battle of Crete North African campaign: Operation Crusader; First Battle of El Alamein; Italian campaign: Battle of Orsogna; Battle of Monte Cassino

Commanders
- Notable commanders: Howard Kippenberger; Jim Burrows

The 20th Battalion was a formation of the New Zealand Military Forces which served, initially as an infantry battalion and then as an armoured regiment, during the Second World War as part of the 2nd New Zealand Division.

The 20th Battalion was formed in New Zealand in 1939 under the command of Lieutenant Colonel Howard Kippenberger. After a period of training it embarked for the Middle East and then onto Greece in 1941 as part of the 2nd New Zealand Division. It participated in the Battles of Greece and later in Crete. Evacuated from Crete, it then fought in the North African campaign with the British Eighth Army. It suffered heavy losses during Operation Crusader, when it was effectively destroyed by the 15th Panzer Division. Brought back up to strength, the battalion played a key role in the breakout of the 2nd New Zealand Division from Minqar Qaim in June 1942, where it had been encircled by the 21st Panzer Division. The following month, the battalion suffered heavy casualties during the First Battle of El Alamein.

In October 1942 the battalion was converted to an armoured unit and designated 20th Armoured Regiment. To replace men lost at El Alamein, personnel were drawn from a tank brigade being formed in New Zealand. The regiment spent a year in Egypt training with Sherman tanks, before embarking for Italy in October 1943 to re-join the Eighth Army. It participated in the Italian campaign, fighting in actions at Orsogna and later at Monte Cassino. The regiment finished the war in Trieste and remained there for several weeks until the large numbers of Yugoslav partisans also present in the city withdrew. Not required for service in the Pacific theatre of operations, the regiment was disestablished in late 1945.

== Formation and training ==
Following the outbreak of the Second World War, the New Zealand Government authorised the formation of the 2nd New Zealand Expeditionary Force (2NZEF), for service at home and abroad. After consulting with the British Government, it was decided that the main New Zealand contribution to the war effort would be in the form of an infantry division, the 2nd New Zealand Division, under the command of Major General Bernard Freyberg. The new division would require nine battalions of infantry and consequently, several infantry battalions were formed from 1939 to 1940 with New Zealand volunteers.

The 20th Battalion was the third such unit (Note: The numbering of the battalions raised for the 2NZEF followed that of the existing 17 infantry battalions of the Territorial Force. Thus, the first battalion formed for the 2NZEF was the 18th Battalion.) to be raised for the 2NZEF and was formed in Christchurch at Burnham Military Camp on 6 October, with Lieutenant Colonel Howard Kippenberger, an experienced Territorial Force soldier and veteran of the First World War, as its commander. It was the last of the three infantry battalions designated to make up the first echelon of the 2nd New Zealand Division, destined for overseas service. (Note: The other two infantry battalions were the 18th and 19th.) Its personnel, all volunteers, were from the South Island of New Zealand. They were formed into four rifle companies, designated A to D and corresponding to the Canterbury, Southland, Nelson-Marlborough-West Coast and Otago districts. A headquarters company included the specialist support troops; signallers, anti-aircraft and mortar platoons, and transport personnel.

Initial training focused on basic drill and fitness along with shooting. The men of 20th Battalion also engaged in company level tactical exercises but did not have training in infantry support weapons, such as anti-tank rifles, as these were not available in New Zealand. The battalion departed for the Middle East on 5 January 1940 aboard HMT Dunera as part of the 4th Infantry Brigade, 2nd New Zealand Division. (Note: The other two brigades of the division were the 5th and 6th Brigades. The 1st, 2nd and 3rd Brigades were Territorial Force formations.) The battalion arrived at its base in Maadi, Egypt on 14 February,and was involved in further training, including brigade level exercises. It also received its infantry support weaponry, such as the Bren light machine gun, Boys anti-tank rifle and Two-inch mortar. As well as training, the battalion performed garrison duty at a defensive position known as the Baggush Box, in the Western Desert and guarding the route between Alexandria and Mersa Matrush, rotating in and out with the other battalions of the 4th Brigade, for most of the next 12 months.

== Greece ==
The British Government anticipated an invasion of Greece by the Germans in 1941 and decided to send troops to support the Greeks, who were already engaged against the Italians in Albania. The 2nd New Zealand Division was one of a number of Allied units dispatched to Greece in early March. The 4th Brigade was tasked with the defence of the Aliakmon Line in northern Greece, with the 20th Battalion preparing and manning the defences along the western end of the line. On 6 April, the Germans invaded Greece and their advance was so rapid that it quickly threatened the Florina Gap. The 4th Brigade was withdrawn to the Servia Pass where it manned defences that were superior to its previous positions.

On 13 April, the battalion suffered its first fatality as a result of enemy action when a soldier was killed in an air raid and the following day, German forces reached the Servia Pass. The brigade, temporarily under the control of the Australian 6th Division, defended its positions for three days before being withdrawn. The battalion was the rearguard of the brigade as it withdrew, with Kippenberger coordinating the demolition of several bridges and avoiding contact with the advancing German armour. The 4th Brigade was used to cover the withdrawal of the division from Greece, and moved to Porto Rafti, east of Athens, from where it was evacuated to Crete on 28 April.

Some personnel of the battalion at a reinforcement depot in Athens ended up at the port of Kalamata, in the southwest of the country. These soldiers, along with other reinforcements, were integrated into an adhoc battalion. One of them, Sergeant Jack Hinton, was instrumental in clearing a wharf at Kalamata that had been captured by advance elements of the 5th Panzer Division. He was later awarded a Victoria Cross (VC) for his actions during this engagement, during which he was wounded and, along with most of the other personnel involved, was made a prisoner of war. By the end of the campaign in Greece, the battalion had 24 personnel killed in action or died of wounds; 80 others were prisoners of war.

== Crete ==
On Crete, it became apparent that the island would be the target of German landings from the air and sea. Freyberg took over command of Creforce, tasked with the defence of Crete, with the New Zealanders, temporarily commanded by Brigadier Edward Puttick in Freyberg's absence, responsible for the area around Chania and Maleme, including the airfield. The 20th Battalion was detached from the 4th Brigade to form part of a new ad hoc 10th Infantry Brigade. While Kippenberger led this brigade, his nominal second-in-command, Lieutenant Colonel Jim Burrows, was in charge of the 20th Battalion for most of the Battle of Crete. The battalion was soon detached from the 10th Brigade to serve as the divisional reserve, in anticipation of a counterattack role should the Germans land on Crete.

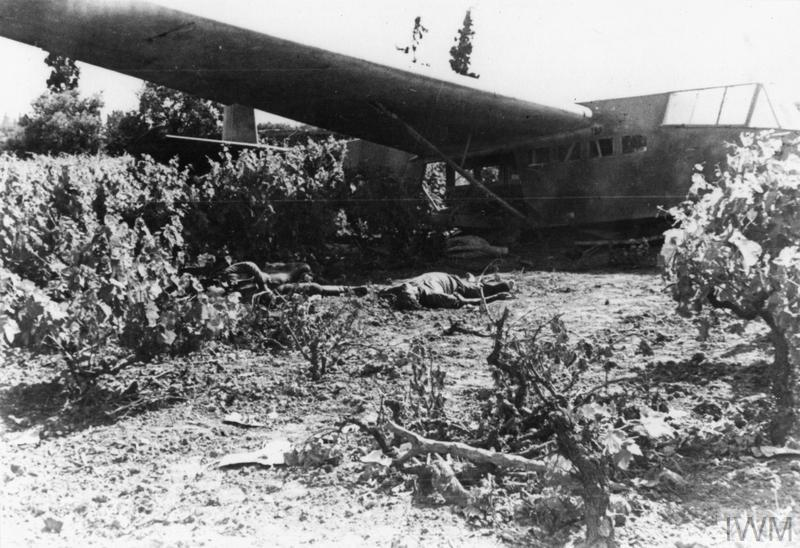
A crashed German glider on Crete

On 20 May 1941, the opening day of the invasion of Crete, the battalion was positioned to the east of the town of Galatas where it was watching the coast due to the risk of a seaborne invasion. It dealt with several Fallschirmjäger (paratroopers) that landed near them. On 22 May, the battalion was used in a counterattack on Maleme airfield, which had been occupied by the Germans the previous day. Puttick was reluctant to release the battalion until it had been replaced in the line; he anticipated the Germans would mount a naval landing later in the evening. The delayed arrival of the relief unit meant that the 20th Battalion was late to its starting position. The counterattack, which also involved the 28th Battalion, commenced at 3:30 am. After a promising start, where the C and D companies of 20th Battalion reached the perimeter of the airfield by 7:30 am, they had to withdraw as their positions were too exposed in daylight hours. The counterattack resulted in heavy casualties, although not as high as the Germans' own losses. It also resulted in an award of a VC to Lieutenant Charles Upham for his actions during the attack on Maleme airfield.

When Galatas fell to the Germans on 25 May, the 20th Battalion was in danger of being cut off. It successfully regrouped and assisted in the recapture of the town. The battalion withdrew on 26 May, which marked the beginning a retreat to Hora Sfakion, on the southwest coast of Crete, for evacuation. Kippenberger rejoined the battalion after his previous command, the 10th Brigade, was disestablished after the Allies' temporary re-capture of Galatas. On arrival at the evacuation beaches, it was found that there was insufficient room on the Australian destroyers that were the designated transport for all of the battalion's personnel. The bulk of the battalion departed on 30 May although Kippenberger was forced to select 40 men to stay behind and form a rearguard under the command of Burrows. After manning defensive positions to prevent Germans infiltrating the cordon around the embarkation beaches, the rearguard was evacuated the following day. The battalion lost 80 soldiers killed or died of wounds on Crete and nearly 90 were made prisoners of war.

== North Africa ==
The 20th Battalion was evacuated to Egypt, having lost over half its original complement of personnel during the Greece and Crete campaigns. After a short period of rest, Kippenberger set about bringing the battalion back up to strength and fighting efficiency. Nearly 400 replacements joined the battalion in mid-June and stragglers, separated from the battalion for various reasons during the previous two months while in Greece and Crete, continued to arrive for several weeks as they made their way across the Mediterranean by various means, including small sailboats. By mid-June, the battalion was at full strength and several weeks were then spent at the battalion's previous positions at Baggush, engaged in intensive desert warfare training. The 2nd New Zealand Division was now preparing for a role in the upcoming Libyan offensive, and several divisional and brigade level exercises were carried out. By October 1941, Kippenberger felt that morale in his 20th Battalion was at a peak and it was ready for action.

=== Operation Crusader ===
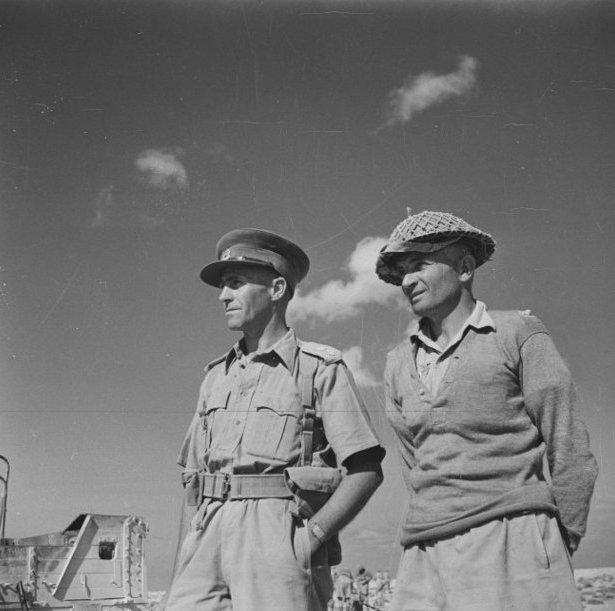
Lieutenant Colonel Howard Karl Kippenberger (left), who was the commanding officer of the 20th Battalion from its formation until late 1941, with Lieutenant Charles Hazlitt Upham, Egypt, October/November 1941

In November 1941, the 2nd New Zealand Division participated in Operation Crusader as part of the British Eighth Army's advance into Libya. The offensive was intended to relieve the siege of Tobruk and force the Axis forces from the Cyrenaica region of Libya. Leading the 4th Brigade on 21 November, the 20th Battalion cut the road between Bardia and Tobruk and attacked several German trucks, one being a vehicle that had been abandoned by the New Zealanders in Greece and put into German service. While the 4th Brigade continued to advance, the battalion stayed to cover the road, occasionally intercepting and destroyed lightly armoured vehicles of the 21st Panzer Division, until 23 November at which time it was relieved and placed in reserve.

The next day, the 20th Battalion led the 4th Brigade in linking up with the 6th Infantry Brigade, struggling to hold onto gains made at Sidi Rezegh. In doing so, the battalion, supported by several Valentine tanks, captured 260 German soldiers and three 88 mm guns. At one stage, Kippenberger had to intervene to prevent the tanks from withdrawing after they came under fire. On 25 November, along with the 18th Battalion, it was tasked with the capture of Belhamed, a hill adjacent to Sidi Rezegh. That night, the units advanced to their objective, bayonets fixed, with the 20th Battalion on the left. Instructed by Kippenberger to take no prisoners, Belhamed was quickly seized with minimal losses. As he moved forward, Kippenberger made a navigational error which resulted in his headquarters company becoming separated from the other companies of the battalion. It took him until daylight to reestablish contact with the remainder of the battalion. Shortly after his arrival, he was wounded by machine gun fire and evacuated. (Note: The medical station treating Kippenberger was captured by the Germans but he was able to escape and make his way back to Allied lines.)

The battalion consolidated its hold on Belhamed, but was exposed to German mortar and artillery fire from the south. Unable to excavate much cover, the New Zealanders could only move about freely at night. In the meantime, a corridor had been opened to Tobruk although there were still pockets of German resistance. Despite the protests of Captain R. Agar, the acting commander, the 20th Battalion was ordered to deal with one such pocket. An attack, made in daylight and without artillery support, failed with heavy casualties incurred on an already depleted battalion. A group of about 140 men, along with most of the battalion's transport, was detached and sent into Tobruk while the rest of the battalion, mainly the rifle companies, remained in position on Belhamed for three days. They were effectively destroyed by elements of the 15th Panzer Division attacking from Sidi Rezegh, which had been overrun the previous day. Only one rifleman managed to escape capture.

The battalion's casualties during Operation Crusader were significant; 60 were killed or died of their wounds, and another 126 were wounded. Over 350 soldiers became prisoners of war.

=== Rebuilding ===
A number of the 20th Battalion's personnel had not been involved in Operation Crusader, most of whom were unfit, recovering from injuries, on leave or attending training courses. These men, along with the 140-odd survivors from the fighting in Libya, formed the nucleus of the reformed battalion at Baggush in early December. Other personnel who had been temporarily deployed elsewhere also returned to the battalion during December. By the end of the month, the battalion, now under the command of Burrows due to Kippenberger's promotion to brigadier and posting to command of the 5th Infantry Brigade, was brought back up to strength with 600 reinforcements. For the next two months, Burrows oversaw training of his new command while it was based at Baggush and then later at Maadi. In February 1942, the battalion moved, with the rest of the 2nd New Zealand Division, to Syria to defend against a possible attack through Turkey on the Middle East oilfields by the Germans.

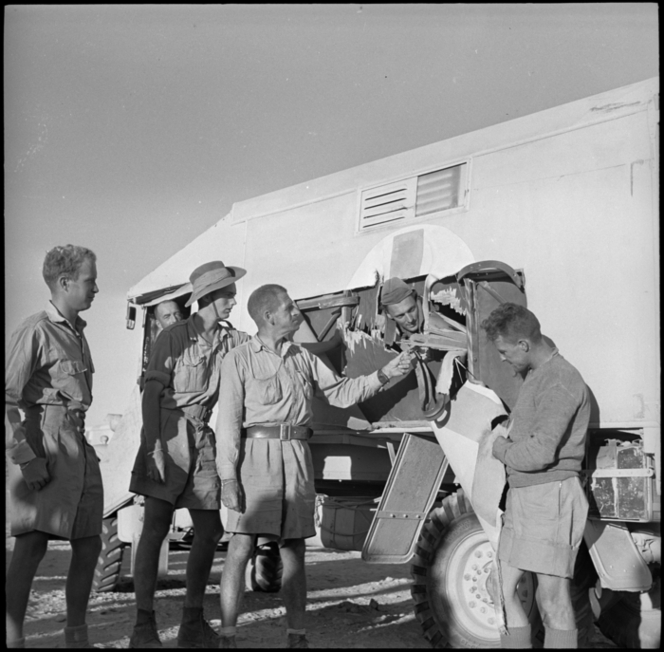
An ambulance damaged by a shell during the breakout at Minqar Qaim

In Syria, the battalion prepared defences in its assigned sector around Djedeide Fortress, digging weapons pits as well as undergoing further training. Following the attack on the Eighth Army's Gazala Line by Panzer Army Africa, the 2nd New Zealand Division was recalled to Libya. On 17 June, the battalion commenced a 320-kilometre (200 mi) journey that took four days to complete. Much of the Eighth Army was in retreat resulting in traffic congestion as the New Zealanders made their way to Mersa Matruh, a neglected fortified position surrounded by minefields. Freyberg, the divisional commander, disliked the plan for his command to be based at Mersa Matruh, regarding it as a trap. After a period of indecision as to where the division was to be best used, it moved to Minqar Qaim. The 20th Battalion remained behind at Matruh for two days to act as security for engineers laying minefields before joining up with the division. It was then sent out on the night of 26 June to attempt a delaying engagement with the advancing Germans. Within a short distance, Burrows felt the mission was too risky for his command, and after laagering up for the night, it returned to Minqar Qaim the next day.

At Minqar Qaim, the division was to hold and delay the advance of the Panzer Army Africa for as long as it could while remaining intact. By the middle of the afternoon of 27 June, the division had been encircled by the 21st Panzer Division. German tanks and infantry approached the 2nd New Zealand Division's positions, including the 20th Battalion's sector on the northern side of the Minqar Qaim escarpment, and were successfully beaten off. Upham, who had the received the VC for his actions at Maleme in Crete, was prominent during this time, directing the supporting anti-tank guns and deliberately drawing fire from German machine guns so that they could be targeted. The battalion's mortars were used to harry enemy infantry trying to clear the mines guarding its position. Later in the day, the battalion's second-in-command, Major Ian Manson, took over leadership from Burrows, who had to take over as commander of 4th Brigade after its previous commander, Brigadier Lindsay Inglis, had taken over the division when Freyberg had been wounded.

Prior to his wounding, Freyberg had already decided that the New Zealanders were to attempt a breakout from their encirclement that night. The infantry of the 4th Brigade breached the German lines in the very early hours of 28 June, creating a hole through which the transport and the rest of the division could follow through. The 20th Battalion bore the brunt of the fighting on the northern flank of the chosen withdrawal route, part of which included a wadi where numerous German vehicles had been parked. The Germans were caught by surprise, with many in a state of undress. Once the battalion's transport arrived, the infantry quickly boarded and departed for the east. During the action at Minqar Qaim and the subsequent breakout, the battalion's casualties were light, with seven men killed, eighteen wounded and just over twenty made prisoners of war, and it reached the El Alamein line that evening.

=== El Alamein ===
Despite the events of Minqar Qaim, the 2nd New Zealand Division was one of the most complete divisions of the Eighth Army still able to be employed along the El Alamein line. The area was subject to further offensives by Panzer Army Afrika and on 14 and 15 July 1942, during the First Battle of El Alamein, the battalion was involved in an effort to assist the British XXX Corps, by taking part in the Battle of Ruweisat Ridge. The battalion was still commanded by Manson as Burrows had become the permanent commander of the 4th Brigade.

The Italian Brescia and Pavia divisions, along with elements of the 15th Panzer Division, held Ruweisat Ridge, which was in the centre of the El Alamein line, and dominated the surrounding area. The 4th Brigade was to take the western end of the ridge, with Kippenberger's 5th Brigade tasked with the capture of the centre of the ridge. The 5th Indian Brigade was allocated to deal with the eastern end. British tanks, in the form of two armoured brigades, were to protect the flanks and be in support to deal with the expected counterattack. However little thought was given to communication and liaison between the infantry and armoured brigades, nor was a clear chain of command established. This would have implications for the outcome of the battle.

After a night-time advance, the 20th Battalion was positioned on the ridge in reserve behind the 18th and 19th Battalions. The advance had routed much of the Italian defences although, on daybreak, it was discovered that numerous strong points had been bypassed, leaving the German line in front of the ridge largely intact. Upham again was heavily involved; he was sent forward to link up with 18th and 19th Battalions, Burrows having lost contact with them. After making his report, Upham was wounded in the elbow but remained forward with his company. The 5th Brigade was also on the ridge but was widely dispersed. Its advance had skirted a regiment of panzers, which in the early hours of the morning of 15 July routed the flanking battalion of the 5th Brigade. This left the battalions of the 4th Brigade even more exposed and receiving fire from the enemy. The Indians were likewise in position having secured their objective.

The supporting British armour was nowhere to be seen and the supporting artillery and anti-tank units were unable to break through, leaving the brigades exposed on the ridge. Kippenberger had difficulty with his radio communications and made a dash through enemy lines to make contact with the British armour. On reaching one of the British brigades, its commanding officer resisted Kippenberger's entreaties to advance and it was not until a passing British general authorised the move that the British mounted up. The tanks moved forward but halted still short of Ruweisat Ridge. A liaison officer from the 4th Brigade made contact and urged them to advance closer but his entreaties were ignored.

A counterattack by elements of the 15th and 21st Panzer Divisions was launched in the afternoon of 15 July. The limited number of anti-tank guns present were exposed and quickly immobilised or had to withdraw. This left the infantry of the 4th Brigade to be surrounded and large numbers were forced to surrender. Some soldiers made it to the positions of the 19th Battalion, but it too became surrounded. By nightfall, the brigade had been overrun and 1,100 soldiers, nearly 200 of them from 20th Battalion, were taken prisoner. The British tanks belatedly moved forward and although this drove off the German armour, the other infantry brigades withdrew from Ruweisat Ridge later in the evening. Upham was among the prisoners of war; for his actions at Minqar Qaim and at Ruweisat Ridge he was later awarded a Bar to the VC he had won on Crete.

== Conversion to armour ==
About half of the 20th Battalion had been wounded, killed or captured during the Battle of Ruweisat Ridge and it, along with the rest of the 4th Brigade, was withdrawn to Maadi to be brought back up to strength. It had previously been decided to form an armoured brigade to provide tank support to the 2nd New Zealand Division and as a result, the 1st New Zealand Army Tank Brigade was formed. This brigade was still undergoing training in New Zealand in September when it was decided to convert the 4th Brigade to armour instead. Personnel were transferred from the tank brigade in New Zealand to bring the brigade, now designated as the 4th Armoured Brigade, back up to strength. As one of the constituent units of the brigade, the 20th Battalion was officially re-designated the 20th Armoured Regiment on 5 October 1942.

The regiment, with three squadrons of tanks, would spend the next year in training, learning to use the signalling equipment and guns of the tanks it was expected to use. One squadron was to be equipped with Crusaders with the other two squadrons operating Shermans. However, the mechanically unreliable Crusaders were later replaced with Shermans. Burrows initially oversaw the transition to armour until he returned to New Zealand on furlough in May 1943 and was replaced by Lieutenant Colonel J. W. McKergow.

With the close of the North African campaign in May 1943, attention then turned to the European theatre of operations. Despite a preference amongst some sections of the New Zealand Government for the 2nd New Zealand Division to be redeployed in the Pacific theatre, it was decided that the division, having served with the Eighth Army throughout the desert campaign, would remain in Europe. Accordingly, in October, the division moved to join the Eighth Army in Italy.

== Italy ==
The men of the 20th Armoured Regiment disembarked at Taranto on 22 October 1943. After spending a fortnight near Galese, they moved to San Bartolommeo, near Galdo. The tanks, which had been shipped separately to Bari, were transported to San Bartolomeo to be reunited with their crews. The regiment then gradually travelled up Italy towards the Sangro River, which it duly crossed on 3 December.

=== Orsogna ===
In the following weeks, the 4th Brigade was involved in a supporting role in the 5th and 6th Brigades' attack on Orsogna, as part of the Moro River Campaign. The 20th Armoured Regiment was brought in the action on the night of 6 December. Although the infantry made some gains, the German defences were too strong and the attack soon faded into a stalemate, with a number of back and forth actions. On 15 December, three squadrons of the regiment were brought in to reinforce the 18th Armoured Regiment, which had lost several tanks in an advance, and had insufficient numbers to exploit a potential opening to Orsogna. Later in the afternoon, one squadron pushed forward but encountered German Panzer IV tanks and was beaten back having lost five of its 13 tanks. Confused orders and poor coordination with the infantry had compromised the advance.

Two more squadrons of the regiment were involved in a major engagement the next day, spearheading a drive to Orsogna, along with two companies from the 28th Infantry Battalion. Forewarned by the events of 15 December, the German defences were well prepared. German artillery fire scattered the supporting infantry, leaving the tanks exposed as they advanced. Seven tanks were destroyed and another abandoned as a result of anti-tank fire. Despite the best efforts of the infantry, they were unable to flank the anti-tank guns and Kippenberger, as commander of the 5th Brigade and in overall charge of the attack, called off the advance. The regiment was involved in a further attack on 24 December, supporting the 28th Infantry Battalion and consolidating some initial gains. Stubborn German defence and the onset of poor weather halted the advance. Although the 20th Armoured Regiment lost 15 tanks in the fighting around Orsogna, generally it had acquitted itself well and was withdrawn from the line the following month. One major issue identified was communication with the infantry; the aerials for the tanks' wirelesses were later found to have been incorrectly installed. Lieutenant Colonel H. A. Purcell took over command of the regiment, replacing McKergow who had been wounded.

=== Cassino ===
Following its withdrawal from the Orsogna area, the 2nd New Zealand Division was one of a number of divisions that was transferred from the Eighth Army to the Fifth Army, then engaged on the western side of the Apennines. This was part of an overall strategy to breach the Gustav Line and break an otherwise deadlocked Italian front. Together with the 4th Indian Division and supporting British and American artillery, the division formed the New Zealand Corps, under the command of Freyberg. The corps moved to Cassino, the defenders of which had resisted American forces for several weeks. The town was in a valley dominated by mountains, one of which was topped by the Monte Cassino monastery.

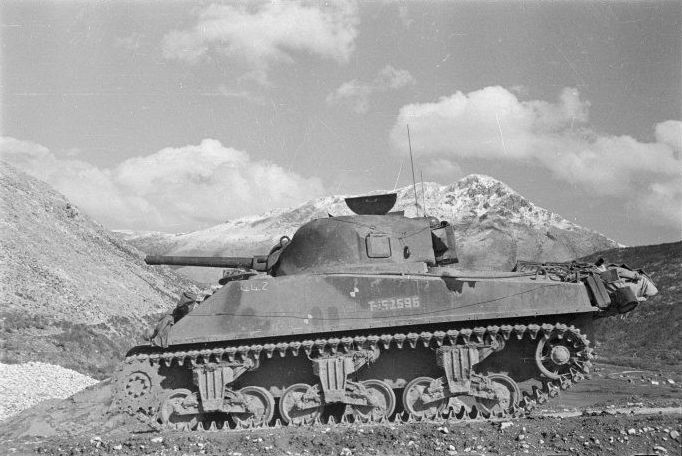
A Sherman tank at Cassino

As at Orsogna, the 20th Armoured Regiment was to play a supporting role for the infantry in the forthcoming Cassino attack. An earlier attempt by the New Zealanders in February to take Cassino had failed. By this time, the regiment was under the command of Lieutenant Colonel J. Ferguson, who had previously led the 18th Armoured Regiment; Purcell had been sent to Egypt as commander of the Armoured Corps training depot there. When a renewed attack began on 15 March, the regiment was initially held as a reserve, ready to exploit any breakthrough by the infantry but this did not eventuate. The infantry struggled to make progress in the face of determined resistance. Over the next week, some of the squadrons of the regiment became involved in small scale raid actions, the first of which was on 19 March. This involved 16 of the regiment's Shermans, along with 28 other armoured vehicles from United States and Indian units, advancing to the Monte Cassino monastery via a trail up the slopes of the mountain. Although the German defenders lacked anti-tank guns, they were well dug in and supported by artillery and mortars. Without infantry support, the advance along the trail came to a halt. Soft ground stripped some tanks of their tracks and nine of the squadron's tanks were disabled or destroyed. The armour withdrew in the afternoon when it was noticed that the Germans appeared to be preparing a counterattack.

On 24 March, the regiment moved into the area of Cassino controlled by the New Zealand infantry to relieve the 19th Armoured Regiment. Once in position in the town, its tanks essentially became pillboxes. The tanks were vulnerable to artillery and German patrols and the troops of the various squadrons of the regiment were rotated in and out of the town in two day shifts. While the New Zealand infantry had been relieved by the Guards Brigade in early April, the 20th Armoured Regiment stayed in the line. Unable to move the tanks, their crews had to remain in them during daylight hours, only coming out at night. The regiment was kept in the town until the end of the month. The operations at Cassino resulted in 20 men killed or who later died of their wounds.

After the New Zealand Corps was disbanded, a period of rest and training in the Volturno valley followed for the 20th Armoured Regiment before it returned to action in May. Back under the command of Purcell, who had returned from Egypt, it was temporarily split from the 4th Brigade and its various squadrons detached in support of separate operations being conducted by 5th and 6th Brigades in advances to Avezzano. Following the Normandy landings, the Italian campaign was reduced to a sideshow, although one which still had considerable value in tying down German forces that could otherwise be used elsewhere. The regiment, now rejoined with the 4th Brigade, supported the infantry brigades as they advanced to Florence. Carrying infantry of the 23rd Battalion, one squadron of the regiment's Shermans were the first New Zealanders to enter Florence itself on 4 August. After being withdrawn for a rest, the 2nd New Zealand Division was transferred in September to the I Canadian Corps, then on the Adriatic coast, and advanced up to Rimini. Here the regiment's B Squadron supported an attack by a Greek mountain brigade towards Rimini on 14 September.

After the 2nd New Zealand Division advanced to and crossed the Fiumicino River, the 4th Brigade was involved in its first action as a brigade on 19 October. This was an attack towards the Savio River, with the 20th Armoured Regiment on the left flank, and was primarily a tank action, in contrast to previous battles in which the armour supported the infantry. Small groups of German paratroopers and panzergrenadiers were destroyed and the regiment reached the Savio the next day, having advanced 11 kilometres (6.8 mi) to complete its objectives. It then supported the 2nd Canadian Infantry Brigade in making its own attack across the river on the evening of 21 October. The regiment's Shermans fired an hour-long barrage of high explosive shells along their front to create a diversion, under the cover of which the Canadians made their own landings on the far bank of the Savio. Soon after this action, some of the regiment's tanks were replaced with the Sherman Firefly, which was equipped with a 17-pounder main gun, superior to the conventional Shermans.

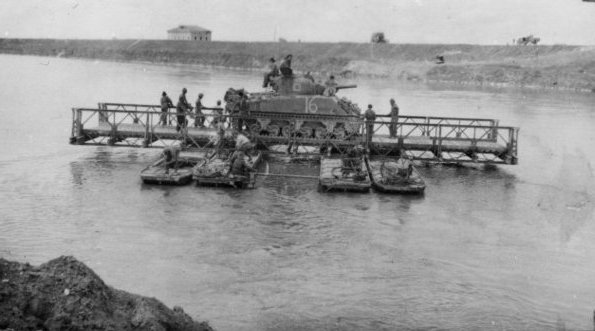
Transporting a 20th Armoured Regiment Sherman over the Po River, 1945

In late 1944, the 20th Armoured Regiment crossed the Lamone River and its squadrons supported the infantry battalions of the 6th Brigade in attacks in and around the town of Faenza in December. The regiment then wintered along the Senio River. It would be involved in supporting infantry on the front lines until early February 1945 when it was rested. During this time, the regiment's manpower was reduced by the equivalent of a squadron when the division was reorganised to add another infantry brigade. Along with many of the regiment's experienced personnel, Purcell returned to New Zealand on furlough and was replaced by Lieutenant Colonel H. Robinson, who had served with the Divisional Cavalry.

=== Advance to Trieste ===
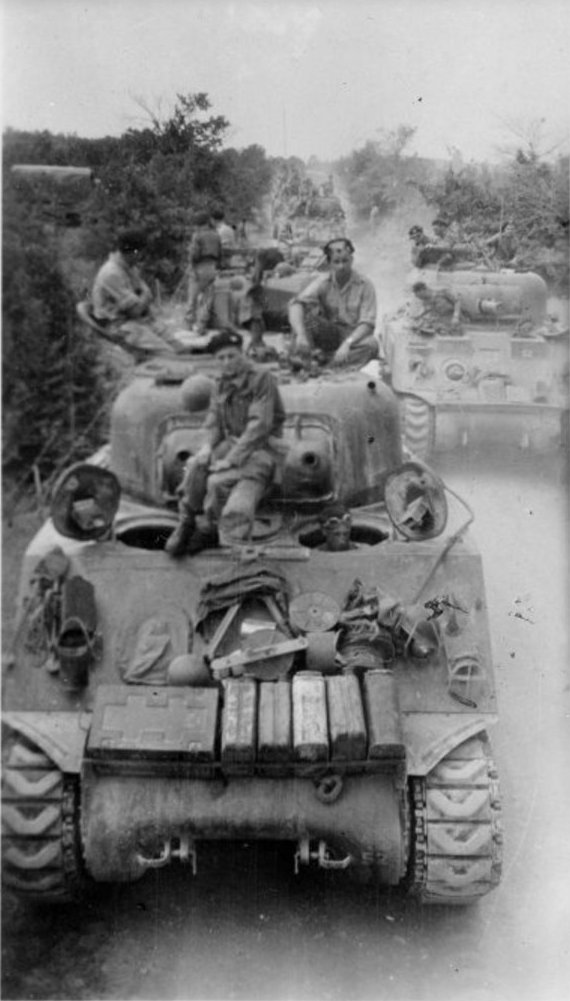
Shermans of the 20th Armoured Regiment on the road to Trieste, May 1945

After a period of rest, the 20th Armoured Regiment returned to the front lines in early April. Along with the 19th Armoured Regiment, on the night of 10 April, it supported the New Zealand infantry's crossing of the Santerno River, the first of a series of advances against the retreating German rearguard. On 2 May, the regiment's A Squadron was the leading element of the 2nd New Zealand Division and entered Trieste. While most of the German garrison quickly surrendered, some diehard elements were encountered who refused to surrender to either the New Zealanders or the Yugoslav partisans also present in the city, even when fired upon with tank guns at near pointblank range. Many were killed by the partisans once the buildings they were sheltering in were set on fire. In one instance, on the outskirts of Trieste, the partisans refused to allow 1200 Germans, with their equipment, to surrender to one of the regiment's tank troops. As situation grew increasingly tense, the New Zealanders were ordered by Freyberg to depart the scene to avoid escalating the matter.

The regiment, along with the rest of the 2nd New Zealand Division, remained in and around Trieste for several weeks to counter the presence of the partisans, who had laid claim to the city. At one point, the regiment was involved with a standoff with Yugoslav tanks, that ended with the partisans leaving. It was not until mid-June that the partisans withdrew from the city. With the conclusion of hostilities in Europe, it took several weeks for the New Zealand Government to decide whether the division would be needed for service in the Pacific theatre of operations. Since early 1944, the regiment's longest serving men had been steadily returned to New Zealand on furlough, and most were not required to come back to active service. By the end of August, the last elements of the regiment withdrew from Trieste to winter positions near Florence.

In mid-September, it was decided to disband the 2nd New Zealand Division and send its latest reinforcement drafts, then assembling in New Zealand, to Japan instead to serve as a separate occupation force known as Jayforce. The men of 20th Armoured Regiment were not required for duty in Japan and this accelerated the demobilisation process. Personnel steadily left Italy for England and then onto New Zealand via ship. The regiment, wintering near Florence, was officially disbanded on 2 December 1945.

During the war, the 20th Battalion and its successor, the 20th Armoured Regiment, lost 366 officers and men either killed in action or who later died of their wounds, including 30 men who died as prisoners of war. Nearly 750 personnel were made prisoners of war.

== Honours ==
Some of the personnel of the 20th Battalion were highly decorated, including Upham and Hinton, both of C Company, who were awarded three VCs between them. Six members of the battalion, including some of its commanders, (Note: Kippenberger, Burrows, Purcell and Robinson.) were awarded the Distinguished Service Order while four other personnel were appointed Members of the Order of the British Empire. One of these was the regimental chaplain for his efforts in organising and evacuating wounded infantry while the regiment wintered along the Senio River in Italy. Several other awards for gallantry were also made; nine Military Crosses were awarded to officers of the battalion, four non-commissioned officers received the Distinguished Conduct Medal (DCM), and 13 other soldiers were awarded the Military Medal. The British Empire Medal was awarded to a staff sergeant and two personnel received foreign awards; one, an officer, received the Greek Military Cross and the other, John Denvir, a non-commissioned officer who was already a recipient of the DCM, was awarded the Soviet Medal for Valour.

The 20th Battalion and its successor, the 20th Armoured Regiment, was awarded the following battle honours:

Mount Olympus, Servia Pass, Olympus Pass, Molos, Greece 1941, Crete, Maleme, Galatas, 42nd Street, Withdrawal to Sphakia, Middle East 1941–44, Tobruk 1941, Sidi Rezegh 1941, Sidi Azeiz, Belhamed, Zemla, Alam Hamza, Mersa Matruh, Minqar Qaim, Defence of Alamein Line, Ruweisat Ridge, El Mreir, Alam el Halfa, North Africa 1940–42, Orsogna, Cassino I, Advance to Florence, San Michele, Paula Line, Faenza Pocket, Rio Fontanaccia, St. Angelo in Salute, Pisciatello, The Senio, Santerno Crossing, Bologna, Sillaro Crossing, Idice Bridgehead, Italy 1943–45. (Note: The battle honours awarded for its work as an infantry battalion were entrusted to the Canterbury Regiment, Otago Regiment, Southland Regiment, and The Nelson, Marlborough and West Coast Regiment. Those awarded to the 20th Armoured Regiment are entrusted to the 3rd Armoured Regiment.)

== Commanding officers ==
The following served as commanding officers of the 20th Battalion/20th Armoured Regiment:

- Lieutenant Colonel H. K. Kippenberger (September 1939 – April 1941); (Note: Kippenberger later achieved the rank of major general and briefly commanded the 2nd New Zealand Division before being wounded.)
- Lieutenant Colonel J. T. Burrows (April–May 1941; December 1941 – July 1942; August 1942 – June 1943); (Note: Burrows later achieved the rank of brigadier.)
- Major I. O. Manson (July 1942);
- Lieutenant Colonel D. J. Fountaine (July–August 1942);
- Lieutenant Colonel J. W. McKergow (September 1942; November 1942; June–December 1943);
- Lieutenant Colonel H. A. Purcell (December 1943 – January 1944; May–December 1944; January–March 1945);
- Lieutenant Colonel J. B. Ferguson (January–May 1944);
- Major P. A. Barton (December 1944 – January 1945);
- Lieutenant Colonel H. A. Robinson (March–October 1945);
- Major W. H. Ryan (October–December 1945).
