= John Levy MacDuff =

New Zealand-born lawyer and magistrate

The Honourable John Levy MacDuff MC

Chief Justice of Fiji
- In office 1962–1963
- Preceded by: Albert George Lowe
- Succeeded by: Clifford Hammett

Personal details
- Born: 11 December 1905 Wellington, New Zealand
- Died: 11 July 1963 (aged 57) Suva, Fiji

John Levy MacDuff MC (11 December 1905 – 11 July 1963) was a New Zealand-born lawyer and magistrate. He served as Chief Justice of Fiji from 1962 until his death the following year.

== Biography ==
MacDuff was born in Wellington, New Zealand on 11 December 1905. He was educated at Wellington College before studying at Victoria University College. He subsequently worked a barrister and solicitor.

During World War II he joined the 27th Machine-Gun Battalion. He was awarded the Military Cross in January 1943 for his efforts in the Western Desert campaign in 1942, and was mentioned in dispatches. He went on to serve as the battalion's Commanding Officer between September 1943 and February 1944, before becoming Commanding Officer of the 25th Battalion, a post he held until June 1944. After leaving the army, he was appointed Assistant Legal Advisor to the Western Pacific High Commission in Fiji in late 1944.

Shortly after arriving in Fiji, MacDuff became Acting Solicitor-General. He served as a District Magistrate between 1946 and 1948, before becoming a Chief Magistrate, a post he held until relocating to Kenya to serve as a puisne judge in 1953.

MacDuff returned to Fiji in 1962 to become Chief Justice, a role he held until his death at his home in Suva the following year.
