= John Denvir (soldier) =

New Zealand soldier (1913–1973)

- Born: 5 May 1913; Glasgow, Scotland
- Died: 11 March 1973 (aged 59); Blenheim, New Zealand
- Military career
- Allegiance: New Zealand
- Service years: 1939–1944
- Rank: Second lieutenant
- Units: Yugoslav partisans 20th Battalion
- Conflicts: Second World War; Battle of Greece
- Awards: Distinguished Conduct Medal; Medal for Valor (Soviet Union)

John Denvir, DCM (5 May 1913 – 11 March 1973) was a New Zealand soldier who fought in the Second World War with the Yugoslav partisans. He was a recipient of the Soviet Medal for Valor, the only New Zealand soldier of the Second World War to be honoured in this way.

Born in Scotland, Denvir's family emigrated to New Zealand when he was a boy. On the outbreak of the war, he enlisted in the 2nd New Zealand Expeditionary Force (2NZEF) for service in the conflict. Made a prisoner of war during the Battle of Greece, he was held in a camp in Yugoslavia from April 1941. He escaped in December and linked up with Yugoslav partisans. He became a leader in the partisans' activities against the occupying German forces and was later awarded the Distinguished Conduct Medal for his actions during an attack on a train. His services with the partisans resulted in him being awarded the Soviet Medal for Valor. Wounded several times during his service with the partisans, he was repatriated to New Zealand in June 1944. He was discharged from the 2NZEF in September 1944. He later operated a taxi business and died in 1973.

== Early life ==
John Denvir was born on 5 May 1913 in Glasgow, Scotland, to Michael Joseph Denvir, a dock worker, and his wife Jeanie née Ambrose. The Denvir family moved in New Zealand in 1925 and he completed his education at a Marist Brothers school in Christchurch. He then became a farm worker but was later employed as a storeman in Christchurch. In June 1934, he married Edna née Musson; the couple had four children.

== Second World War ==
On the outbreak of the Second World War, Denvir enlisted in the 2nd New Zealand Expeditionary Force (2NZEF), being raised for service aboard. He was posted to the 20th Battalion which was being formed at Burnham Military Camp in Christchurch. In January 1940 the battalion left New Zealand as part of the 1st Echelon of the 2nd New Zealand Division. The next several months were spent training in Egypt but in March 1941, the division was one of a number of Allied formations sent to Greece to assist in the defence of the country. By this time Denvir had been promoted to corporal.

Following the commencement of the Battle of Greece in April 1941, the Allies soon found themselves outclassed and in retreat. Within days, it was decided to evacuate the New Zealanders from beaches in the Peloponnese peninsula. However, the 20th Battalion's route to the beaches were cut off. While most were eventually evacuated from alternative sites to the west of Athens, Denvir was among those who were captured and made prisoners of war.

Denvir was taken to occupied Yugoslavia where he was held in a prisoner of war camp at Maribor. In September 1941, he managed to escape with two others and made his way to Zagreb, where he was recaptured a week later. As punishment, he received three weeks of solitary confinement. This did not deter him from further escape attempts, and in December he again was able to get away from his captors. This time, he made his way to Ljubljana, in Slovenia. Initially intending to make their way to Turkey, a neutral power, he and another escapee decided to link up with Yugoslav partisans (National Liberation Army and Partisan Detachments of Yugoslavia) the following month instead.

=== Service with the Yugoslav partisans ===
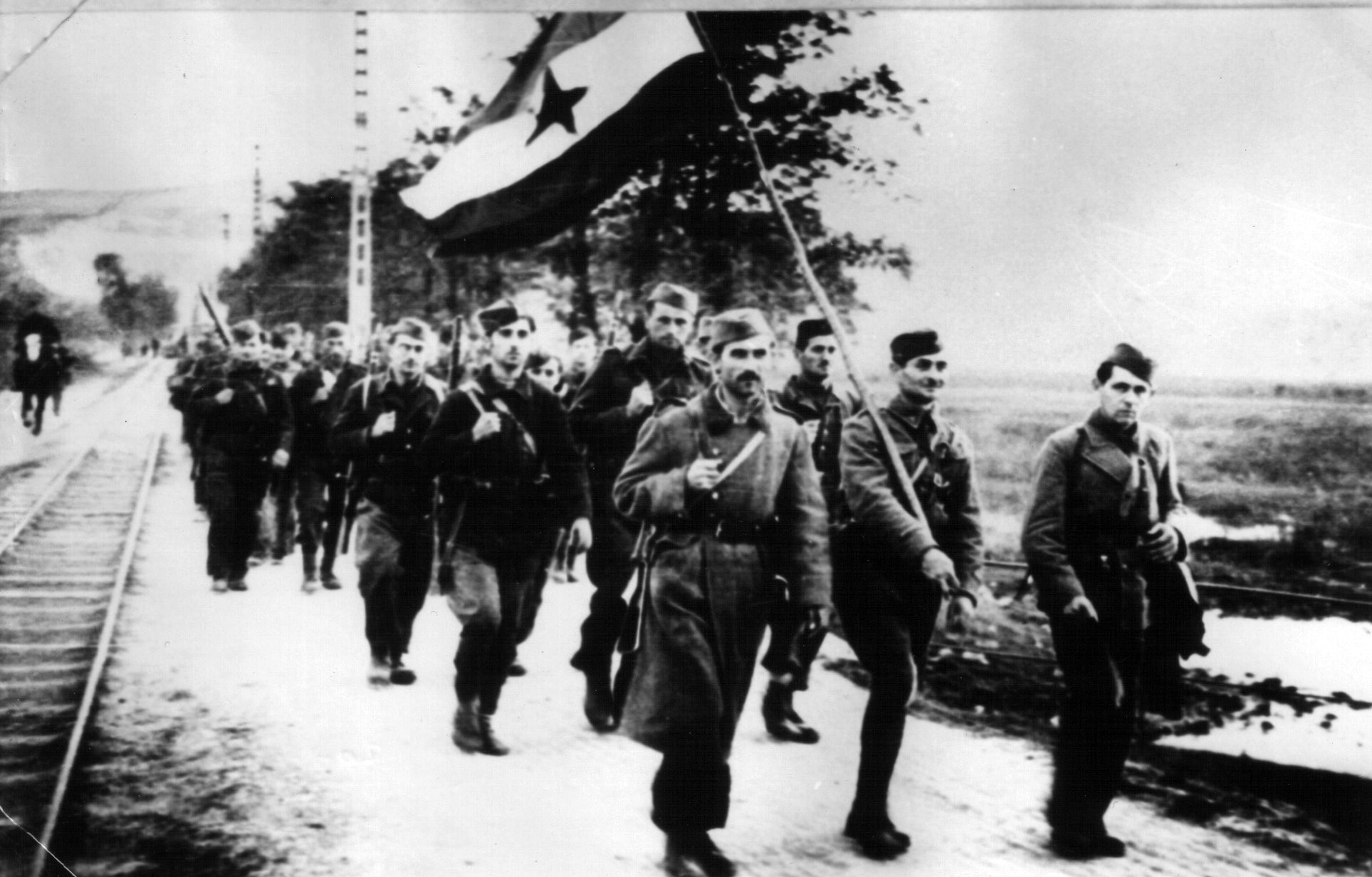
Yugoslav partisan soldiers

Initially, Denvir served as a machine-gunner but soon raised a group of 60 mounted infantry. By October 1942, he was serving with the 1st (Ljubo Sercer) Battalion, Krimski Odred, and later was commander of the 2nd Battalion of the 4th Slovenian National Freedom Shock (Ljubo Sercer) Brigade. Earlier in the year, it had been reported in New Zealand that Denvir had died and as a result, a death certificate had been issued. His employer had been making regular payments into a bank account set up for him while he was on active service and this paid out £100 to his wife on the announcement of his death. By January 1943, it had become known that he was alive and serving with the partisans; his employer resumed making payments into his bank account.

Wounded for the fourth time in September 1943, Denvir was promoted to honorary lieutenant in the partisans the following month. In December, he was given command of a partisan brigade. Early the following year, he was evacuated to Italy to receive medical treatment. On his recovery, he worked with a British organisation providing equipment and supplies to the partisans before rejoining the 2nd New Zealand Division. He was promoted to sergeant, with effect from the date of his capture during the Battle of Greece, and then received a commission as a second lieutenant.

For his actions during an attack mounted by the partisans on a train in August the previous year, Denvir was recommended for the Distinguished Service Medal (DCM) by a British liaison officer working with the Yugoslavs. The DCM was published in the London Gazette on 27 April 1944, in recognition of "gallant and distinguished services in the field". The same month, he was awarded the Soviet Medal for Valour. The recommendation, based on his service in Yugoslavia with the partisans, was made by Soviet liaison officers attached to the headquarters of Marshal Josip Tito. Denvir was the first and only New Zealand soldier of the war to be recognised with this award.

He was sent back to New Zealand on furlough, arriving in June 1944. Initially passed as fit for a return to duty with the 2nd New Zealand Division, his status was later downgraded and he was considered unfit for active service. In September he was discharged from the 2NZEF. He was invested with the Soviet Medal for Valour by Brigadier E. Rowlings, the commander of the Southern Military District, in a ceremony at Burnham Military Camp on 14 December.

== Later life ==
Returning to civilian life, he went into partnership in a taxi business, operating in Temuka. He later lived in Christchurch and then Blenheim. He made at least two visits to Eastern Europe; one in 1955 to Slovenia during which he was invested with a number of Yugoslav awards for his war service there and received an honorary promotion to major in the Yugoslav Army. On this trip, Marshal Tito presented him with a sporting rifle. The second visit was in 1967, for a reunion of the battalion he led during the war. He died on 11 March 1973 in Blenheim, survived by his wife and children.
