= George Herbert Clifton =

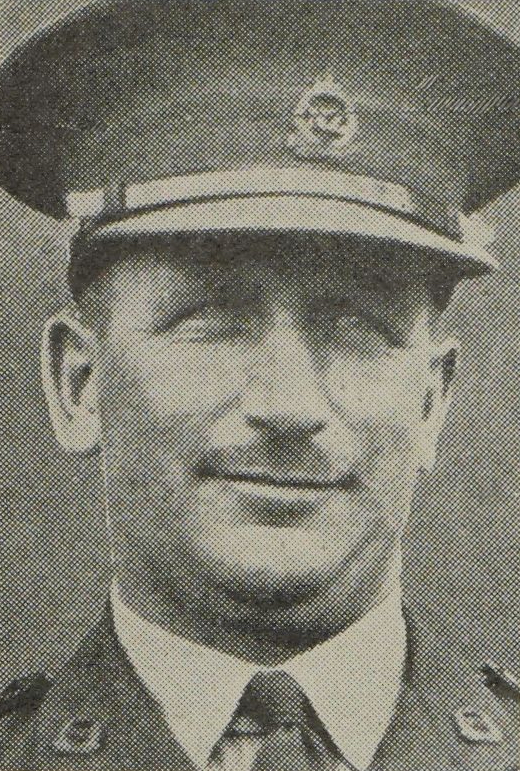
- Born: 18 September 1898; Napier, New Zealand
- Died: 13 March 1970 (aged 71); Taupō, New Zealand
- Military career
- Allegiance: New Zealand
- Branch: New Zealand Military Forces
- Service years: 1919–1953
- Rank: Brigadier
- Commands: 6th Infantry Brigade
- Conflicts: World War I; First Waziristan Campaign; World War II; Battle of Greece; Battle of Crete; North African campaign
- Awards: Distinguished Service Order & Two Bars; Military Cross

Brigadier George Herbert Clifton, DSO & Two Bars, MC (18 September 1898 – 13 March 1970) was a senior officer in the New Zealand Military Forces and a three-time recipient of the Distinguished Service Order.

Clifton joined the New Zealand Military Forces in 1915 but was too young to serve abroad during the First World War and was posted to the New Zealand Staff Corps. He was seconded to the Indian Army from 1918 to 1921 and served in the Waziristan Campaign. Returning to New Zealand he held a series of staff posts as well attending military courses. He volunteered to join the Second New Zealand Expeditionary Force (2NZEF) upon the outbreak of the Second World War. Initially the brigade major of the 5th Infantry Brigade in 1940, he was promoted to lieutenant colonel and appointed commander of the Divisional Engineers, 2nd New Zealand Division. He participated in the Battle of Greece as well as the early fighting in North Africa for which he was awarded the Distinguished Service Order and bar. Given command of the 6th Infantry Brigade in February 1942, he was captured during the fighting around El Alamein in September 1942.

As a prisoner of war, Clifton made a total of nine escape attempts including from camps in Italy and Germany. His last escape attempt saw him reach American lines in March 1945 and his exploits as a prisoner of war were recognised with a further bar to his DSO. After the war he served on the staff of the British Commonwealth Occupation Force in Japan, commanded a training school, and was posted to the War Office in London. His final appointment before retiring from the New Zealand Military Forces in 1953 was as commander of the Northern Military District. He became a sheep farmer in later life and spent his final years as a city councillor in Taupō. He died in 1970 at the age of 71.

== Early life ==
Clifton was born on 18 September 1898 in Greenmeadows, near Napier, the son of an immigrant from the United States. He received his primary education at a school in Wairoa and attended Pahiatua District High School before taking civil service examinations. However, rather than pursue a business career, he decided to join the New Zealand Military Forces in 1915. He was one of New Zealand's regular annual intake of 10 cadets to enter the Australian Army's Royal Military College in Duntroon in the Australian Capital Territory.

== Military career ==
On graduation from Duntroon in 1918, Clifton was posted to the New Zealand Staff Corps. Although the First World War had not yet ended, he was too young to serve abroad with the New Zealand Expeditionary Force. Instead he was stationed as an instructor at Trentham Military Camp before becoming aide-de-camp to Major General Alfred Robin, the commandant of the New Zealand Military Forces. In late 1918, he was seconded to the Indian Army and served on the Derajat Column during the Waziristan Campaign on the North-West Frontier of India. During his service, he was awarded the Military Cross. His secondment ended in early 1921 and he returned to New Zealand and resumed his duties with the New Zealand Staff Corps.

Clifton held a series of staff posts with the Territorial Force while seeking a further secondment to India or, failing that, a post with the Royal Engineers. In aid of the latter goal, he was sent to England to attend the School of Military Engineering. Back in New Zealand by 1926, he was promoted to the rank of captain and appointed adjutant of engineers, signals, and mounted units in the Auckland region. He commenced a two-year course at the Staff College in Camberley in 1932, after which was attached to firstly, the Committee of Imperial Defence, and then the War Office in London. He returned to New Zealand in 1935 and posted as a staff officer at the headquarters of the New Zealand Military Forces.

== Second World War ==
When the Second World War broke out, Clifton was the duty officer at the military's headquarters in Wellington and dispatched the orders that mobilised the New Zealand Military Force. Promoted to major shortly afterwards, he was an instructor at Narrow Neck Camp in Auckland during the period in which the first echelon of the Second New Zealand Expeditionary Force (2NZEF) was being raised. He was initially selected to command 24th Battalion, 6th Infantry Brigade, but this was reconsidered when the commander of the 2NZEF, Major General Bernard Freyberg, decreed that the battalion commanders of the brigade be under the age of 35; Clifton was 41. However, when offered the post of Brigade Major for the 5th Infantry Brigade by its commander, Brigadier James Hargest, he gratefully accepted.

Clifton embarked for the Middle East with the second echelon of the 2NZEF, the bulk of which were the troops of the 5th Brigade in early May 1940. However, following the invasion of France, and the entry of Italy into the war, the convoy transporting 5th Brigade were diverted to England, where it arrived in mid-June. The brigade would form part of the defences in the south of England, in anticipation of the expected invasion by German forces. A few months after his arrival in England, Clifton was appointed commander of the Divisional Engineers and promoted to lieutenant colonel.

Along with the 2nd New Zealand Division, Clifton participated in the Battle of Greece. This resulted in a defeat for the Allied forces which were forced to leave the country to avoid capture by the Germans. During the evacuation, he commanded the divisional rearguard, which was designated 'Clifton Force'. Traveling onto Egypt after being transported to Crete, he missed the subsequent Battle of Crete. He was later recognised for his services in Greece with the Distinguished Service Order (DSO).

=== North Africa ===
Back in Egypt, the 2nd New Zealand Division underwent a period of refit and training before it was assigned to the British Eighth Army, which was then engaged in the North African Campaign. It took part in Operation Crusader in November 1941 where the Eighth Army attempted to break through to Tobruk. Clifton earned a bar to his DSO during Operation Crusader when, during the Battle of Sidi Rizegh, he led a convoy of supply trucks which delivered vital ordnance to artillery units shelling advancing elements of the Afrika Corps.

In February 1942, Clifton was promoted to brigadier and given command of 6th Infantry Brigade which, at the time, was in Syria along with the rest of the division. However, following the attack on the 8th Army's Gazala Line by Panzer Army Africa, the 2nd New Zealand Division was dispatched to the lines of El Alamein and while its 4th and 5th Brigades went south to Minqar Qaim, the 6th Brigade, was initially held in reserve before being ordered to man the Kaponga Box at Bab el Qattara. The brigade remained here, watching first the retreating British stream by and then the Germans, at a distance, for several days before moving to Amiriya. It missed the action of 14–15 July at Ruweisat Ridge which saw the destruction of a large part of the 4th and 5th Brigades. The 6th Brigade was recalled back to the El Alamein lines to relieve what was left of the 4th Brigade. A few days later, it was involved in a nighttime attack on the El Mrier Depression. The aim was to secure the depression to create a route through which British armour could penetrate. The brigade successfully achieved its objective and was consolidating its positions when the 21st Panzer Division attacked on 22 July.

At daylight, the tanks of the 21st Panzer Division caught Clifton's brigade headquarters which, along with 24th and 25th Battalions, was positioned in the relatively shallow El Mrier Depression. Firing from the edge of a low cliff overlooking the depression, the Germans caused heavy losses amongst the infantry battalions before passing through their positions in pursuit of the British armour. Over 900 men were either killed, wounded, or captured including the majority of 24th Battalion and half of the 25th Battalion. Clifton, with his brigade headquarters, had been among those captured. Removing his rank insignia, he pretended to be a medical orderly. That evening, he played dead and managed to escape. The remnants of Clifton's brigade moved to the southern section of the Alamein line where it manned defensive positions during the Battle of Alam Halfa, Rommel's failed attempt to cut off the Eighth Army.

On the night of 3 September, the brigade was involved in a nighttime attack during which the commander of its 26th Battalion was mortally wounded. With the battalion leaderless and disorganised, Clifton tried to restore order. He approached what he thought were friendly troops only to find himself in the hands of the Italian 185th Infantry Division "Folgore". Debriefed personally by the commander of the Panzer Army Africa, Generalfeldmarschall Erwin Rommel, Clifton was taken away afterwards by truck but promptly jumped out to try and escape. Chased down by the guards, he was recaptured only to give them the slip again. He walked for five days to El Alamein before he was noticed by the crew of a German tank and captured. Taken before Rommel again, he was threatened with a firing squad if he was to escape again. He was flown to Italy the next day.

=== Prisoner of war ===
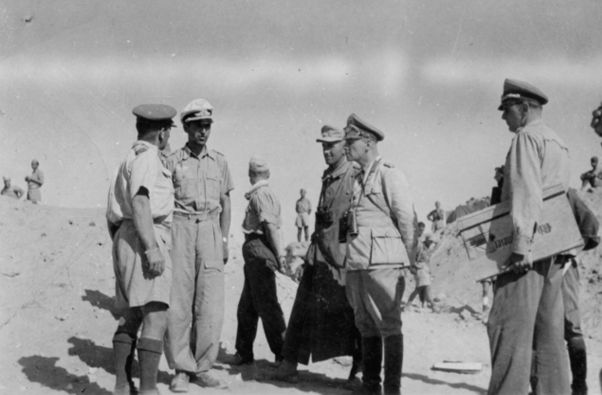
Brigadier George Clifton (left), having been made a prisoner of war, meeting Generalfeldmarschall Erwin Rommel in Egypt

Held in a prisoner of war camp, Clifton soon managed to escape and made his way as far as the Swiss border before being recaptured. Transferred to a punishment camp at Gavi, he made three further escape attempts, the last of which was in September 1943 and involved the digging of a tunnel with 60 other prisoners. Detected before they could break out, the prisoners were moved to a camp in Germany. En route, Clifton jumped from the train transporting them through Germany. His escape was short lived and while hiding in a bush near the train tracks, he was shot in the leg and stomach by a guard. Other prisoners, under guard, retrieved him and dressed his wounds. Taken to a hospital, he was treated for his wounds; the bullet, which had lodged in his stomach, was later given to him as a souvenir. In March 1944, after recuperating for four months, he was placed in a camp near Hadamar which was specially designated for recidivist escapees.

His last escape attempt was in March 1945, when he managed to make his way over several barbed wire fences and evade guards. Disguised as a labourer from Holland, he was able to reach advancing American troops and, having established his identity, was flown to England and then onto New Zealand, he arrived in April 1945 and was treated in a servicemen's hospital in Rotorua. He received a second bar to his DSO for his exploits as a prisoner of war, having made a total of nine escape attempts from captivity. Shortly after his return to New Zealand, his wife, Doris, died.

== Postwar ==
After the war ended, Clifton was based in Singapore, working for the reparation of New Zealanders that had been interned by the Japanese. In March 1946, he was posted to the staff of the British Commonwealth Occupation Force in Japan, where he remained for a year before returning to New Zealand to take up command of the training school at Trentham Military Camp. In his final years in the military, he was attached to the War Office in London for a time, and then commanded the Northern Military District back in New Zealand before retiring in 1953. The previous year, his book The Happy Hunted, an account of his wartime experiences, was published. In 1953, Clifton was awarded the Queen Elizabeth II Coronation Medal.

== Later life ==
In his retirement, Clifton took up sheep farming in the Hawke's Bay Region for several years. In 1966, he shifted to Taupō where he became a city councillor. He died on 13 March 1970 and is buried in the Returned Servicemen's Association section of the Taupō Cemetery.

== Bibliography ==
- Cody, J. F. (1961). New Zealand Engineers, Middle East. Official History of New Zealand in the Second World War 1939–45. Wellington: Historical Publications Branch. OCLC 460192.
- Grayland, Eugene (1972). More Famous New Zealanders. Christchurch: Whitcombe & Tombs. ISBN 0-7233-0335-5.
- Mason, Wynne W. (1954). Prisoners of War. Official History of New Zealand in the Second World War 1939–45. Wellington: Historical Publications Branch. OCLC 314967494.
- McClymont, W. G. (1959). To Greece. Official History of New Zealand in the Second World War 1939–45. Wellington: War History Branch. OCLC 4373298.
- McGibbon, Ian, ed. (2000). The Oxford Companion to New Zealand Military History. Auckland: Oxford University Press. ISBN 0-19-558376-0.
- Murphy, W. E. (1966). 2nd New Zealand Divisional Artillery. Official History of New Zealand in the Second World War 1939–45. Wellington: Historical Publications Branch. OCLC 460192.
- Pugsley, Christopher (2014). A Bloody Road Home: World War Two and New Zealand's Heroic Second Division. Auckland: Penguin Books. ISBN 978-0-143-57189-6.
- Taylor, Alister; Coddington, Deborah (1994). Honoured by the Queen – New Zealand. Auckland: New Zealand Who's Who Aotearoa. ISBN 0-908578-34-2.
