= Baggush Box =

British fortification in Egypt during WWII

- Part of Western Desert Campaign of the Second World War
- Maaten Baggush; Near Mersa Matruh in Egypt
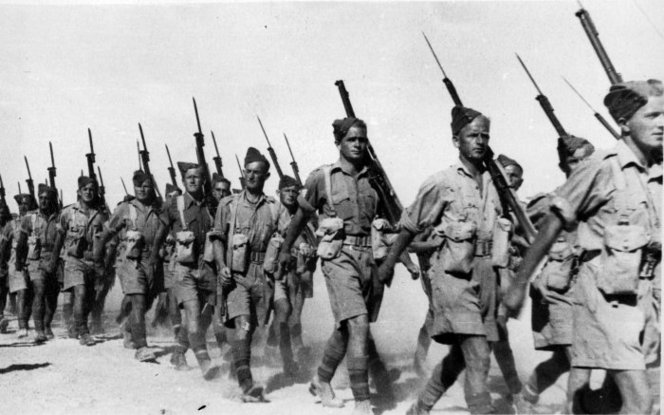
- Men of the 20th Battalion, part of the 4th Infantry Brigade of the 2nd New Zealand Division, marching in Baggush, Egypt, September 1941.

Location
- Coordinates: 31°10′21″N 27°40′10″E

The Baggush Box was a British Army field fortification built in the Western Desert near Maaten Baggush, 35 miles (56 km) east of Mersa Matruh during the Western Desert Campaign of World War II.

== Background ==
The box was built by men of the Western Desert Force (Lieutenant-General Richard O'Connor) as a tented camp, with offices, said to be bomb-proof dug under sand dunes, as a temporary billet for troops taking part in operations against the Italian invasion of Egypt in 1940 by the Italian 10th Army. O'Connor opened his headquarters on 8 June. An airfield was a short distance inland and served as the headquarters of the Desert Air Force (Air Commodore Raymond Collishaw).

== Prelude ==
On 28 June, Marshal of the Air Force (Maresciallo dell'Aria) Italo Balbo, Governor-General of Libya and Commander-in-Chief of Italian North Africa (Africa Settentrionale Italiana ASI), flew a reconnaissance sortie over Sidi Barrani and Maaten Baggush. Balbo's aircraft was shot down by the cruiser San Giorgio in Tobruk harbour and the occupants killed while coming in to land; Balbo was replaced by Marshal Rodolfo Graziani.

On 26 November, O'Connor held a meeting at the Baggush Box after the completion of "Training Exercise No. 1", a rehearsal for Operation Compass, in which attacks on fortified positions had been practised, the troops not being told that the positions were replicas of the Italian camps at Nibeiwa and the Tummars. The officers with O'Connor reported that the method laid down in The Division in Attack was too slow and sacrificed surprise, leaving the attackers vulnerable to air attack. The Air Officer Commanding in Chief, Air Marshal Arthur Longmore, was being pressured from London to send formations to Greece and to provide air cover for Operation Compass, he stripped the air defences of Egypt of two squadrons and a flight, which he placed at O'Connor's disposal.

Before the offensive began O'Connor vacated the Baggush Box for a forward headquarters and Lieutenant-General Henry Maitland Wilson the General Officer Commanding-in-Chief of the British Troops in Egypt took over the headquarters.
