= Senio =

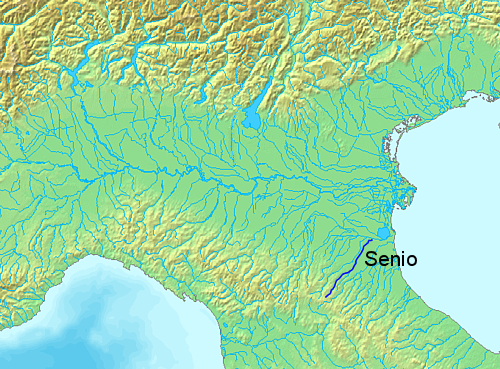

Location
- Country: Italy

Physical characteristics
- Source
  - location: Poggio dell'Altella
  - elevation: about 900 m (3,000 ft)
- Mouth: Reno
  - coordinates: 44.5475°N 12.0954°E
- Length: 92 km (57 mi)
- Basin size: about 450 km^{2} (170 mi^{2})
- Discharge
  - average: 10 m^{3}/s (350 cu ft/s)

Basin features
- Progression: Reno→ Adriatic Sea

The Senio (Romagnol: Sēni) is a 92-kilometre (57 mi) river of Romagna in Italy, the final right-sided tributary of the river Reno. The source of the river is in the province of Florence in the Appennino Tosco-Emiliano mountains. The river flows northeast into the province of Ravenna and flows near Casola Valsenio, Riolo Terme, Castel Bolognese, Cotignola, Lugo, Bagnacavallo, Fusignano and Alfonsine before entering the Reno. The river has a tributary called the Sintria that flows into it east of Riolo Terme. The river is along the road to Imola.

The mean discharge at its mouth is about 10 cubic metres per second (350 cu ft/s); however this can vary from a minimum of 0.3 cubic metres per second (11 cu ft/s) to a maximum of 500 cubic metres per second (18,000 cu ft/s).

== World War Two ==
The area was the site of several hard-fought battles in the Spring of 1945, during the last phases of World War II in Europe. The Allied crossing of the River Senio was one of the last hurdles that needed to be overcome in order to capture the great Po Valley basin and so complete the campaign in Italy. The German defenders were mostly elite parachute units and, in the very last days of war in Europe, the British 8th Army took many casualties in effecting this defended river-crossing operation. It was also one of the landmarks of the Jewish Brigade in the war.

In a speech to the British Parliament concerning the Jewish Brigade's foundation on 3 July 1944, Winston Churchill pointed out that the Liberation Day would have come exactly 20 years after the British Mandate-Palestine established in 1920 during the San Remo conference.
