= George Dittmer =

New Zealand Army officer (1893–1979)

George Dittmer CBE DSO MBE MC
- Dittmer during the Second World War
- Born: 4 June 1893; Maharahara, New Zealand
- Died: 11 August 1979 (aged 86); Auckland, New Zealand
- Military career
- Allegiance: New Zealand
- Branch: New Zealand Military Forces
- Service years: 1910–1948
- Rank: Brigadier
- Nickname: "The Old Man"
- Commands: 28th (Māori) Battalion (1940–1941); 1st New Zealand Infantry Brigade Group (1942–1943); Fiji Military Forces (1943–1945); Central Military District (1946–1948)
- Conflicts: World War I: Gallipoli campaign; Battle of the Somme; World War II: Battle of Greece; Battle of Crete; Operation Crusader (POW)
- Awards: Commander of the Order of the British Empire; Distinguished Service Order; Member of the Order of the British Empire; Military Cross; Mentioned in despatches

Brigadier George Dittmer CBE DSO MBE MC (4 June 1893 – 11 August 1979) was a New Zealand regular army officer. A veteran of Gallipoli and the Western Front, where he rose from the ranks and won the Military Cross, he was the first commanding officer of the 28th (Māori) Battalion, leading it from its formation in January 1940 through the campaigns in Greece, Crete and Libya. He was awarded the Distinguished Service Order for his leadership in Greece and Crete. Wounded and captured in Libya in November 1941, he escaped back to British lines, and later commanded New Zealand forces in Fiji.

== Early life ==
Dittmer was born at Maharahara, near Dannevirke, on 4 June 1893, the sixth of thirteen children of August Dittmer, who had come to New Zealand from Germany, and Mary King, from Scotland. At the age of seventeen he joined D Company of the Hauraki Regiment as a Territorial volunteer.

== First World War ==
On the outbreak of the First World War, Dittmer enlisted in the Auckland Infantry Battalion and sailed with the Main Body of the New Zealand Expeditionary Force for Egypt in the battalion's Hauraki Company. He landed at Gallipoli on 25 April 1915 and was commissioned as a second lieutenant in June that year. After the evacuation the battalion went to France in 1916, and by 1917 he was a captain. He was awarded the Military Cross in June 1917; the citation, covering September 1916 to February 1917, noted that he had left New Zealand as a private, had the best record of steady service in the battalion, and had commanded his company on the Somme.

Dittmer was wounded several times during the war. After one wound on the Somme he was evacuated to Britain, returning to duty in November 1917 as a major in No. 1 Entrenching Battalion. He later rejoined the Auckland Regiment and served with the army of occupation in Germany.

== Between the wars ==
Dittmer returned to New Zealand in 1919 and joined the Regular Force as a captain. He held a series of appointments in the Auckland military district, including command of the district school of instruction, and was appointed MBE in 1935.

== Second World War ==
=== Māori Battalion ===
At the outbreak of the Second World War, Dittmer was a major in the Regular Force. When the Māori Battalion was raised it was decided that its commanding officer should be a regular officer, and Dittmer was chosen, with the Reserve officer George Bertrand, who was of Māori descent, as his second-in-command. He was promoted to lieutenant colonel and took command in January 1940. According to the historian Monty Soutar, there was some early resentment at the appointment of a Pākehā commander, but it was quickly overcome by Dittmer's professional competence and strict discipline. Major Rangi Logan, who was closely involved in the battalion's early organisation, later said that the army could not have chosen better men for its key posts than Dittmer, Bertrand and the regimental sergeant major, Ace Wood.

Dittmer took the battalion to England in 1940, where Winston Churchill watched it training, and then to Egypt and Greece. In Greece the battalion held a line some 5,000 yards long and was attacked along its whole length; although the line was penetrated at several points, it restored the position with a series of counter-attacks before withdrawing. On Crete it counter-attacked the Germans on at least five occasions and took the largest share of the rearguard work, and Dittmer led it in every engagement. He was awarded the Distinguished Service Order, the citation crediting the battalion's success in Greece to his leadership. In July 1941 he wrote to Sir Āpirana Ngata that the battalion had inflicted many more casualties than it had suffered, and gave the credit chiefly to the fighting spirit and skill at arms of its NCOs and men.

=== Libya and escape ===
In the Libyan campaign of November 1941 the battalion attacked Sollum, where on 23 November Dittmer was wounded by shrapnel in the back and command passed to Captain Eruera Love. He was evacuated to a New Zealand field medical station near Sidi Rezegh, which was then surrounded and captured by German forces. Dittmer escaped with a party of some twenty to thirty men, using the hours of darkness, and despite his wound brought them back to British lines on the Egyptian frontier. He was mentioned in despatches. He formally relinquished command of the battalion in February 1942.

=== Later commands ===
Returning to New Zealand, Dittmer was given the temporary rank of brigadier and command of the 1st New Zealand Infantry Brigade Group, followed by command of the 1st Division until September 1943. He was then seconded to command the Fiji Military Forces and the Fiji Infantry Brigade Group, and was appointed CBE after the war for his services in the Pacific.

== Later life ==
After the war Dittmer commanded Papakura Military Camp, and in 1946 he rejoined the New Zealand Staff Corps and was appointed to command the newly formed Central Military District. He retired from the army in 1948, at the age of 55.

In 1964, when the Palmerston North City Council decided to name streets in its new Awatapu subdivision after soldiers of the Māori Battalion, it consulted Dittmer, who supplied a list of men who had served under him. The subdivision's main road, Awatapu Avenue, was renamed Dittmer Drive in his honour from 1 February 1966. A road at Linton Military Camp is also named after him.

Dittmer died in Auckland on 11 August 1979, aged 86. His obituary in Te Kaea recalled that he was known to his men as "the Old Man", remembered for his stern discipline and his ability to frighten the most unruly soldiers, but respected above all for his courage in action and his knowledge of soldiering, and for his affection for every man who had served under him.
