= Acis and Galatea (disambiguation) =

Acis and Galatea is a story in Greek mythology.

Acis and Galatea may also refer to:

- Acis and Galatea (Handel), a 1718 composition by George Frideric Handel
- Acis and Galatea, or Acis et Galatée, a 1686 opera by Jean-Baptiste Lully

== See also ==
- Acis (disambiguation)
- Galatea (disambiguation)
