= 1st Brigade (New Zealand) =

- Active: 1916–c. 1919; 1939–1944; 1946–1980s 2011–current
- Country: New Zealand
- Branch: New Zealand Army
- Part of: Land Component Commander
- Headquarters: Linton Military Camp

The 1st Brigade is currently the largest unit of the New Zealand Army, and contains most of the army's deployable units. The brigade was formed on 13 December 2011 by amalgamating the 2nd Land Force Group and 3rd Land Force Group. Its establishment formed part of the 'Army 2015' package of reforms.

Previous 1st Brigades in the New Zealand Army have included a brigade in the Middle East and France, 1916–19, a home defence formation active during the Second World War (part of the North Island home defence 1st Division), and a 1 Brigade / Integrated Expansion Force formed to direct three Territorial Force-formed battalions in the 1970s and 1980s.

== History ==
=== First World War ===
The 1st Brigade came into being in Egypt in early 1916, when the New Zealand and Australian Division was re-organised in the wake of the Gallipoli Campaign, and the New Zealand Division was formed. Under the command of Brigadier General Harry Fulton, the brigade initially consisted of four infantry battalions, being the 1st Battalions of the Auckland, Canterbury, Otago and Wellington Regiments. In this configuration, the brigade was transferred to the Western Front in Europe, and fought through the Battle of the Somme before the New Zealand Division was restructured. This saw the brigade reconfigured, swapping its two South Island battalions (the 1st Canterbury and 1st Otago) with the two North Island battalions (2nd Auckland and 2nd Wellington) of the 2nd Brigade. This placed all the North Island battalions in the 1st Brigade while all the South Island formations were in the 2nd Brigade. Following this, the brigade fought in the Battle of Messines and the Third Battle of Ypres during 1917, before helping to turn back the German spring offensive in early 1918, and then taking part in the Allied Hundred Days Offensive in the final months of the war. After the armistice, the brigade was committed briefly to post-war occupation duties until the New Zealand Division disbanded in early 1919.

=== Second World War ===
The 1st Infantry Brigade was re-established prior to the Second World War as a Territorial Force formation composed of part-time reservists. At the outbreak of war on 3 September 1939, it formed part of the field force for the Northern District. At this time it commanded the 1st Hauraki Regiment (headquartered at Paeroa), 1st North Auckland Regiment (Whangarei) and 1st Waikato Regiment (Hamilton).

On 1 November 1941, the 1st Brigade became part of the newly formed Northern Division in the Northern Military District. The division's two brigades were the 1st and 12th Brigade Groups. Later the Northern Division became the 1st Division. The 12th Brigade Group was one of the new headquarters, and both these units continued to be composed of reservists. During early 1942, camps were constructed for the 1st Brigade Group in South Auckland and the 12th Brigade Group at Kaikohe. The 1st Brigade subsequently moved to a camp near Warkworth.

After the threat of invasion passed, the 1st Brigade and the other home defence formations were reduced in size during 1943. By the end of the year the seven brigade (including 1st Brigade) and three divisional headquarters comprised a total of 44 personnel, with the soldiers assigned to the Territorial Force units they once commanded having been demobilised. All of these headquarters were disbanded on 1 April 1944.

=== Post-war ===
In 1950, Northern Military District directed four subordinate Area Headquarters, being Area 1 (HQ Auckland), Area 2 (HQ Tauranga), Area 3 (HQ Whangarei), and Area 4 (HQ Hamilton).

In 1963, the Combat Brigade Group (1st Brigade) was established, based on the Northern Military District headquarters at Auckland. Headquarters Northern Military District was disestablished in 1970 and the headquarters became home to Field Force Command.

=== Reformation ===
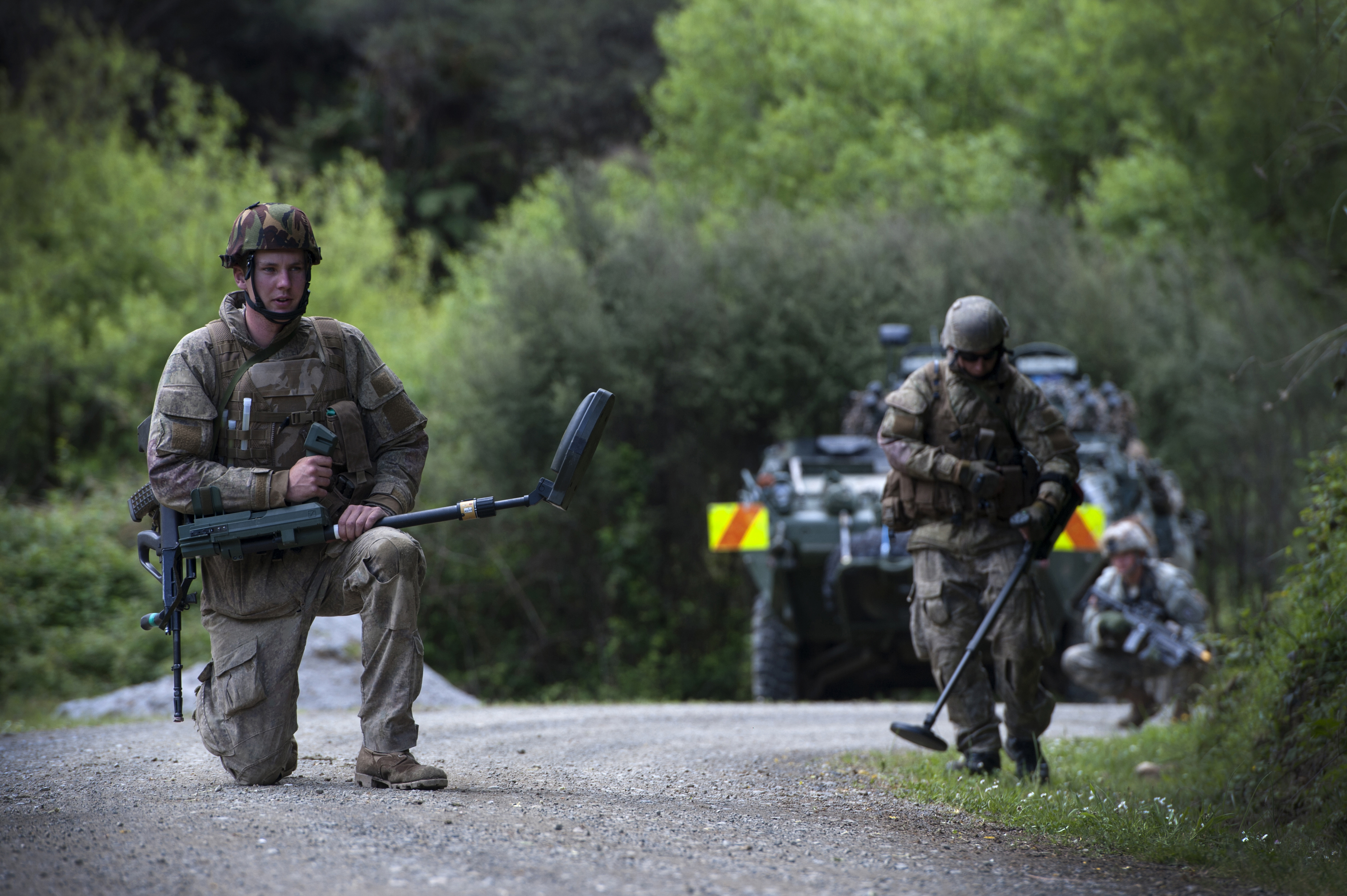
Soldiers and a NZLAV from the 1st Brigade during a training exercise in 2014

In 2011, the 1st Brigade was reformed from the headquarters of the 2nd Land Force Group at Linton Camp. Its role upon formation was to command all of the New Zealand Army's operational units, other than the 1st New Zealand Special Air Service Regiment.

== Order of Battle ==
Correct as at 1 Dec 2025:

- 1st (New Zealand) Brigade
  - Headquarters, 1st Brigade (Linton Military Camp)
  - 1st Battalion, Royal New Zealand Infantry Regiment (Linton Military Camp)
    - Queen Alexandra's Company
    - Victor Company
    - Whiskey Company
    - Support Company
    - Combat Service Support Company
    - Waikato Mounted Rifles (Hamilton) (Reserves)
  - 2nd/1st Battalion, Royal New Zealand Infantry Regiment (Burnham Camp)
    - Alpha Company
    - Bravo Company
    - Delta Company
    - Support Company
    - Depot Company
    - Combat Service Support Company
  - 2/4 Battalion, Royal New Zealand Infantry Regiment (Burnham Camp) (Reserves)
    - Canterbury Company (Christchurch)
    - Otago and Southland Company (Dunedin)
    - Nelson, Marlborough and West Coast Company (Invercargill and Nelson)
  - 3/6 Battalion, Royal New Zealand Infantry Regiment (Papakura Military Camp) (Reserves)
    - Auckland Company (Auckland)
    - Hauraki Company (Tauranga)
    - Northland Company (Whangarei)
  - 5/7 Battalion, Royal New Zealand Infantry Regiment (Trentham Military Camp) (Reserves)
    - East Coast Company (Napier)
    - Wellington Company (Wellington)
    - West Coast Company (Whanganui)
  - 16th Field Regiment, Royal Regiment of New Zealand Artillery (Linton Military Camp)
    - 161 Battery
    - 163 Battery
    - 11/4 Battery (Reserves)
    - Combat Service Support Troop
  - 1st Command Support Regiment (Linton Military Camp)
    - 1st (New Zealand) Military Intelligence Company
    - 2nd (New Zealand) Military Intelligence Company
    - 1st Signal Squadron (Reserves)
    - 2nd Signal Squadron
    - 5th Signal Squadron
    - Military Network Operations and Security Centre
  - 2nd Engineer Regiment, Royal New Zealand Engineers (Linton Military Camp)
    - 2nd Field Squadron
    - 3rd Field and Emergency Response Squadron
    - 25 Engineer Support Squadron
  - 2nd Combat Service Support Battalion, Royal New Zealand Army Logistic Regiment (Linton Military Camp)
    - 2nd Workshop Company
    - 5th Movements Company
    - 10th Transport Company
    - 21 Supply Company
    - Combat Service Support Company (North)
    - 38 Combat Service Support Company (Reserves)
  - 3rd Combat Service Support Battalion, Royal New Zealand Army Logistic Regiment (Burnham Camp)
    - 3rd Workshop Company
    - 3rd Transport Company
    - 3rd Catering & Supply Company
    - 3rd Active Reserve Company (Reserves)

== See also ==
- Structure of the New Zealand Army
