= Waikato Regiment =

16th (Waikato) Regiment Waikato Regiment
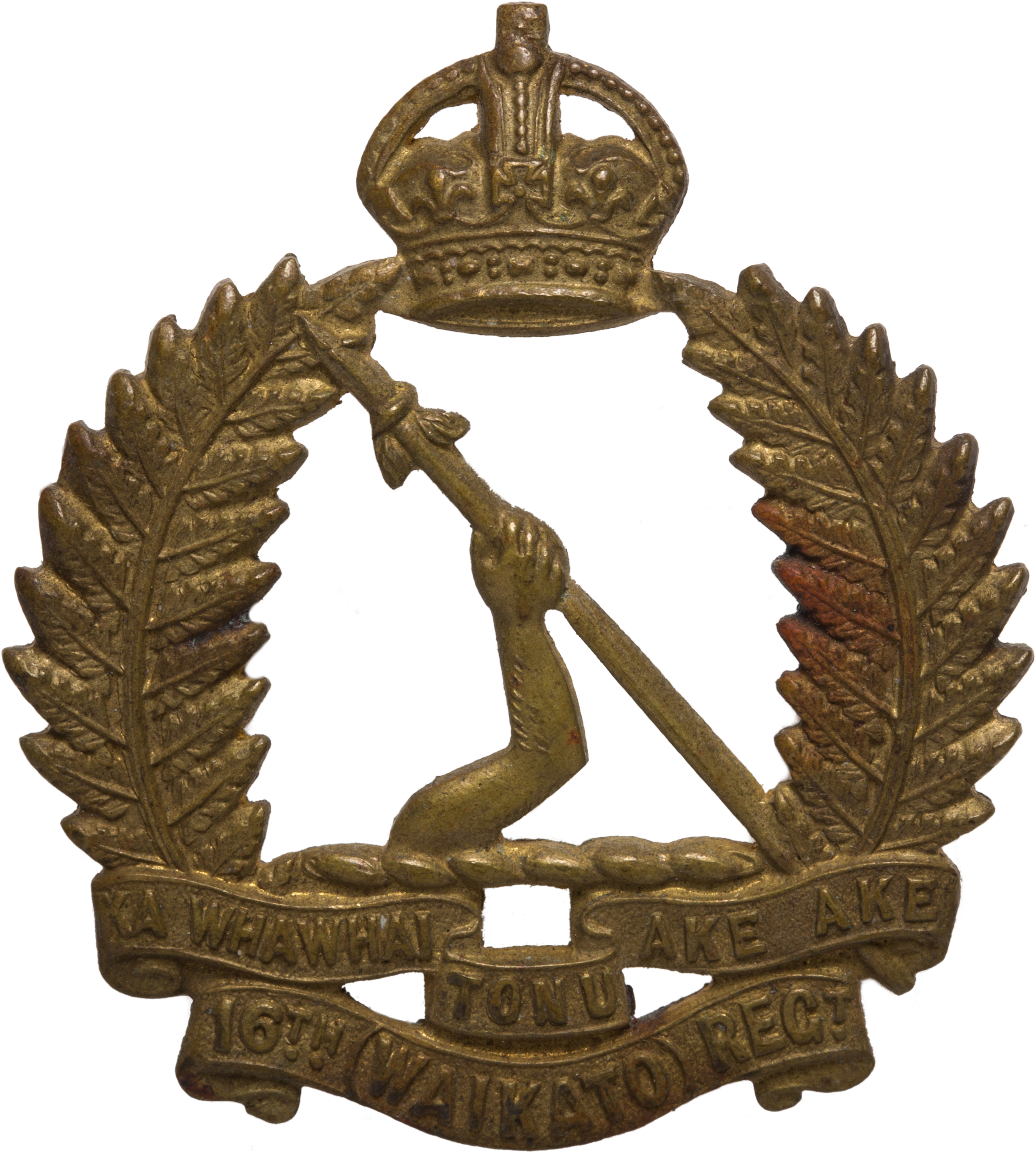
- Cap badge of the Waikato Regiment
- Active: 1911–1950
- Country: New Zealand
- Branch: New Zealand Military Forces
- Type: Infantry
- Garrison/HQ: Hamilton
- Mottos: Ka whawhai tonu ake ake (Māori: "we shall fight for ever and ever")
- Engagements: First World War; Second World War

The Waikato Regiment was a territorial infantry regiment of the New Zealand Military Forces. The Regiment was formed in 1911 as the 16th (Waikato) Regiment and provided service companies to the Auckland Infantry Regiment during the First World War. Men from the Regiment also served with the 18th, 21st, 24th and 29th battalions of the 2nd New Zealand Expeditionary Force during the Second World War. The regiment was absorbed by the 1st Armoured Regiment (Waikato) of the Royal New Zealand Armoured Corps in 1950

== History ==
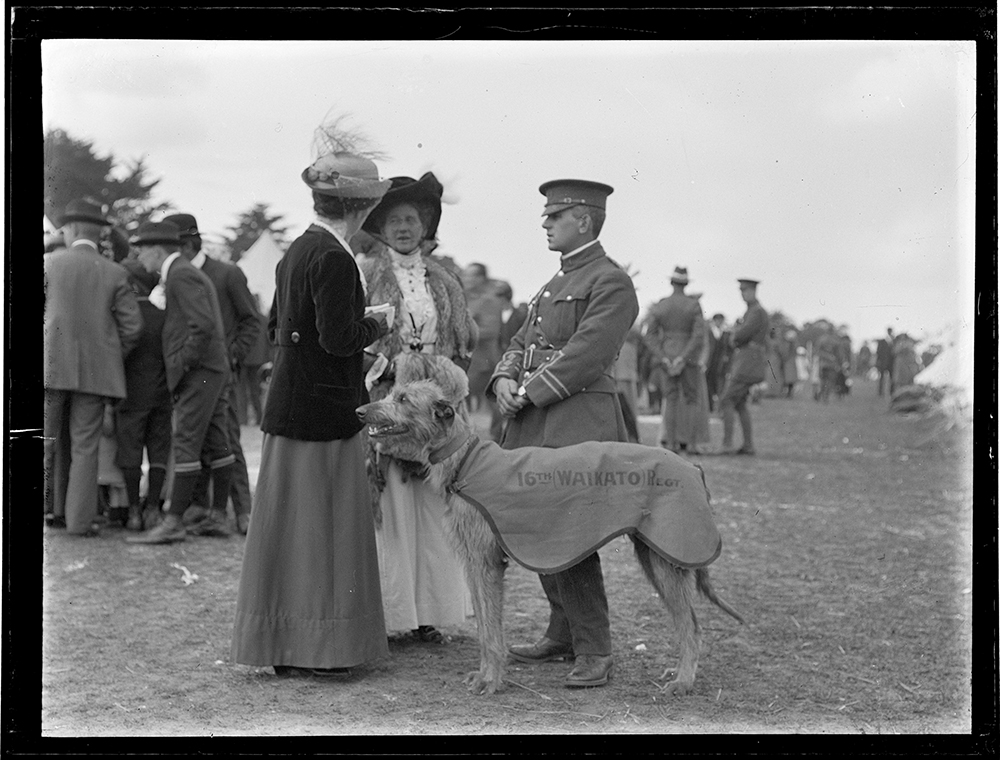
Mascot of the 16th (Waikato) Regiment

The 16th (Waikato) Regiment was formed on 17 March 1911 as part of a reorganisation which saw the old Volunteer Force converted into a Territorial Force based on compulsory military training. The new regiment was completely new (i.e. had no lineage to units of the Volunteer Force) and was presented with a stand of colours in May 1914 by the Governor of New Zealand, the Earl of Liverpool.

At the outbreak of the First World War in August 1914, the decision was made to form a New Zealand infantry brigade of four battalions from the existing territorial regiments. The 16th (Waikato) Regiment provided the 16th (Waikato) Company to the Auckland Battalion, which saw service in the Gallipoli Campaign. Following the evacuation from Gallipoli in 1916, the Auckland Battalion was expanded to a regiment of two battalions. The Auckland Infantry Regiment would see action on the western front, engaging in the battles of the Somme, Messines, Passchendaele, German Spring Offensive and the Hundred Days Offensive. A third battalion was also raised in 1917, but was disbanded in 1918 due to manpower shortages. Both the 2nd and 3rd Battalions were organised along the same lines as the 1st Battalion, each with their own 16th (Waikato) Company. The Auckland Infantry Regiment was disbanded at the end of the war.

In 1921, the New Zealand territorial regiments were reorganised into larger regiments, similar to those of the First World War, with the 16th (Waikato) Regiment becoming the 4th Battalion, Auckland Regiment. The amalgamations were short lived and in 1923, the previous organisation was reverted to, although the ordinals were dropped and the 4th Battalion was redesignated as the Waikato Regiment. Another organisation occurred in 1937 when the Waikato Regiment was reduced to a depot and supplied a single rifle company to the 1st Composite Battalion. The battalion also had rifle companies from the Hauraki and North Auckland Regiments. The composite system was abandoned in May 1939, just prior to the outbreak of the Second World War and the territorial regiments were brought up to full battalion strength.

During the Second World War, the Waikato Regiment remained in New Zealand for home defence. A 2nd Battalion was formed in 1942 by redesignating the 9th Battalion of the National Military Reserve. The 1st Battalion became part of 1st Infantry Brigade of the 1st New Zealand Division and was expected to provide a mobile response to any invasion throughout the country. The 2nd Battalion remained stationed in the Waikato. The territorial forces were stood down in June 1943 and the 2nd Battalion was formally disbanded in April 1944.

Men from the regiment saw active service overseas with the 18th, 21st, 24th and 29th battalions of the 2nd New Zealand Expeditionary Force. The 18th, 21st and 24th battalions formed part of the 2nd New Zealand Division and saw action in Greece, Crete, North Africa, Tunisia and Italy. The 29th Battalion, was deployed to the Pacific with the 3rd New Zealand Division and saw combat at the Treasury Islands.

The Waikato Regiment was absorbed by the 1st Armoured Regiment (Waikato) of the Royal New Zealand Armoured Corps in 1950.

== Battle honours ==
The Waikato Regiment was authorised to emblazoned the following battle honours earned during the First World War on their colours:

- Flers-Courcelette
- Arras 1918
- Bapaume 1918
- Canal du Nord
- Sambre
- Messines 1917
- Broodseinde
- Krithia
- Landing at Anzac
- Sari Bair, Gallipolli 1915

The regiment also inherited the battle honours of the 18th (till 5 October 1942), 21st, 24th and 29th Battalions. The following battle honours were authorised to be emblazoned on the colours:

- Mount Olympus
- Crete
- Sidi Rezegh 1941
- Ruweisat Ridge
- El Alamein
- Tebaga Gap
- The Sangro
- Cassino I
- San Michele
- The Senio

== Alliances ==
The Waikato Regiment was allied with the following regiments:

- United Kingdom – West Yorkshire Regiment
- Canada – The Royal Montreal Regiment
- Australia – 14th Battalion (Australia)
