= George Bertrand =

New Zealand military officer (1891–1957)

George Frederick Bertrand
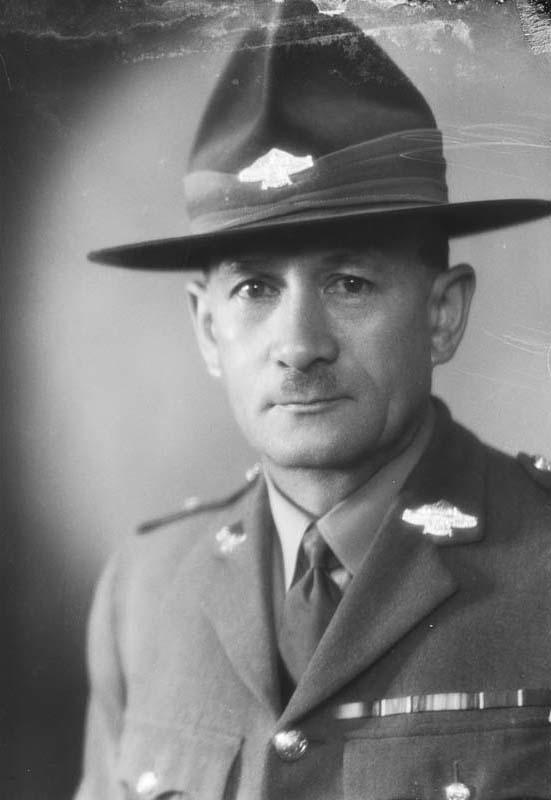
- Born: 9 February 1891; Urenui, New Zealand
- Died: 25 July 1957 (aged 66); Palmerston North, New Zealand
- Burial place: Te Henui Cemetery, New Plymouth
- Military career
- Allegiance: New Zealand
- Branch: New Zealand Military Forces
- Rank: Lieutenant Colonel
- Units: Wellington Infantry Regiment; 28th (Māori) Battalion
- Commands: Taranaki Regiment; 2nd Māori Battalion; Māori Training Unit
- Conflicts: First World War: Gallipoli campaign; Western Front; Second World War: Battle of Greece; Battle of Crete
- Awards: Officer of the Order of the British Empire; Efficiency Decoration
- Other work: Schoolteacher

Lieutenant Colonel George Frederick Bertrand OBE, ED (9 February 1891 – 25 July 1957) was an officer of the New Zealand Military Forces who served in both the First and Second World Wars. A veteran of Gallipoli, he was the first second-in-command of the 28th (Māori) Battalion and later commanded the 2nd Māori Battalion in New Zealand.

== Early life ==
George Bertrand was born on 9 February 1891 in Urenui, New Zealand. His father, also named George Bertrand, was an English immigrant, and his mother, Toroa Te Ikawairangi, was Māori of Ngāti Mutunga. Bertrand attended school at Urenui and Te Aute College, then Wellington Teachers' Training College and Victoria University College, where he graduated BA in Latin and history. Before the war he served in the volunteers and Territorials, including the officers' training corps in Wellington, and became a schoolteacher.

== Military career ==
=== First World War ===
With the outbreak of the First World War, Bertrand enlisted on 13 August 1914 in the 11th (Taranaki) Company of the Wellington Battalion, and sailed with the Main Body in October 1914. He was made a lance corporal on the Suez Canal in February 1915. At Gallipoli he was wounded by bullets on 8 May 1915, during the Second Battle of Krithia, and by a shell splinter to the head on 8 August 1915, the day the Wellington Battalion took Chunuk Bair. He rose through the ranks there to corporal, sergeant and, in November 1915, company sergeant major. He was commissioned in the field as a second lieutenant at Moascar, Egypt, in February 1916, returned to New Zealand, and in August 1916 embarked again with the 16th Reinforcements.

On the Western Front he was promoted lieutenant in June 1917 and was wounded a third time, by a shell splinter to the right thigh, on 20 August 1917 near La Basseville. In December 1917 he was attached to the 3rd Canadian Tunnelling Company and then the Second Army School of Instruction, and he commanded a company of the 1st Battalion, Wellington Regiment, as a temporary captain. He was evacuated to England with trench fever in May 1918, qualified first class at the musketry schools at Bisley and Hayling Island, and served as musketry officer at Sling Camp. He returned to New Zealand on the Remuera in 1919 and was discharged as a lieutenant on 23 November 1919.

=== Between the wars ===
On 5 January 1921 Bertrand married Kathleen Mary Rosborough Simpson; they had four children. From 1920 he taught Latin, mathematics and history at New Plymouth Boys' High School. He served as a territorial officer in the Taranaki Regiment and rose to become its commanding officer in 1931.

=== Second World War ===
In November 1939 Bertrand, by then a major, was appointed second-in-command of the newly formed 28th (Māori) Battalion under Lieutenant Colonel George Dittmer. When the battalion sailed with the Second Echelon on 1 May 1940, Dittmer was appointed officer commanding troops aboard the transport Aquitania, and Bertrand took temporary command of the battalion for the voyage. The convoy was diverted to Britain, where the battalion spent the second half of 1940 guarding against a German invasion; at Farnham, Bertrand entered the battalion's swimmers in a local carnival, where they won every event. In October 1940 he briefly commanded the battalion in England. The battalion reached Egypt in March 1941.

He served with the battalion in Egypt and the Western Desert, and went with it to Greece in 1941. During the withdrawal he was detached on 23 April to join the staff organising the evacuation near Athens, and he rejoined the battalion on Crete.

On Crete he fell ill and was a patient in the 7th General Hospital when German paratroopers overran it at the start of the invasion in May 1941. He and about 300 other patients were rounded up and marched towards Galatas. Near the positions of the 19th Battalion, a New Zealand patrol attacked the guards and the prisoners were freed. Bertrand rejoined battalion headquarters while still unwell, and during the battalion's bayonet charge at 42nd Street on 27 May he was sent forward by Dittmer to call the companies back before they pushed too far.

After Crete, Bertrand left the battalion in October 1941 to become second-in-command of the New Zealand Composite Training Depot, and in November he was placed on the New Zealand roll for non-medical reasons. He reached Wellington on 24 December 1941. After serving with the North Auckland Regiment as a temporary lieutenant colonel in 1942, he commanded the 2nd Māori Battalion from November 1942 and then the Māori Training Unit, moving with it to Trentham in May 1944, until he was posted to the Reserve of Officers in October 1944. In October 1943 he was among the battalion officers given places of honour at the investiture of Moana-Nui-a-Kiwa Ngarimu's posthumous Victoria Cross at Ruatoria.

In mid-1945, with the war in Europe over, Bertrand wrote proposing that a Māori contingent be raised for the war against Japan, drawn from reinforcement drafts that had not seen action in Italy. Sir Āpirana Ngata forwarded the letter to the Army on 2 July 1945, describing Bertrand as "a good disciplinarian" who "should do very well" in such a role. Japan surrendered the following month.

== Civilian life ==
Bertrand returned to teaching at New Plymouth Boys' High School after the Second World War. He was a member of the Ngarimu Scholarship Fund Board.

== Later life ==
Bertrand died in Palmerston North on 25 July 1957 from injuries suffered in a car crash the previous day, in a collision north of Ōtaki. He was buried in Te Henui Cemetery in New Plymouth. He was the grandfather of New Zealand Labour Party Member of the Parliament of New Zealand Georgina Beyer MNZM, who was born in November 1957 and named after him.

== Honours and awards ==
Bertrand was made an Officer of the Order of the British Empire in the 1943 New Year Honours.

| Order of the British Empire | | 1914-1915 Star | |
| British War Medal | Victory Medal | 1939–1945 Star | Africa Star |
| Defence Medal | War Medal 1939–1945 | New Zealand War Service Medal | Efficiency Decoration (New Zealand) |
| Colonial Auxiliary Forces Officers' Decoration | New Zealand Long and Efficient Service Medal | New Zealand Territorial Service Medal | King George V Silver Jubilee Medal |
