= Auckland (Countess of Ranfurly's Own) and Northland Regiment =

3rd Battalion (Auckland [Countess of Ranfurly's Own] and Northland)
- Active: 9 January 1965–2013
- Country: New Zealand
- Branch: Army
- Type: Line Infantry / Light Role
- Size: Battalion
- Garrison/HQ: Auckland
- Motto(s): Onward
- March: Speed the Plough; The Duchess; Scotland the Brave

Commanders
- Colonel in Chief: HM The Queen
- Colonel of the Regiment: Lieutenant Colonel (Retd) Grant Ellis ED, RNZIR

Insignia
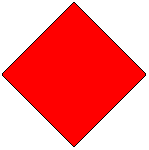
- Tac Sign
- Abbreviation: 3ANR

The 3rd Battalion, Auckland (Countess of Ranfurly's Own) and Northland Regiment was a Territorial Force Battalion of the Royal New Zealand Infantry Regiment, with headquarters in Arch Hill Auckland Army Centre. The unit consists of company-sized units which have their headquarters in Auckland and Whangārei. The unit was part of Training and Doctrine Command (TRADOC) headquartered at Waiouru (see Structure of the New Zealand Army).

== History ==
The Auckland and Northland Regiments can trace their roots back to the early colonial days of New Zealand. The oldest unit it traces its heritage back is the Auckland Fencibles, a militia defence unit of Auckland formed in 1846. They were a key player in the Invasion of Waikato. The unit then moved on to play other key roles in the New Zealand land wars, in which earned the battle honour 'New Zealand', which was not added to the Auckland Regiments battle honours and recently there has been agitation to keep it that way.

1st Auckland Infantry (Countess of Ranfurly's Own) Battalion was then formed from the amalgamation of the Victoria Rifles, New Zealand Native Rifles, Auckland Rifles, Gordon Rifles, Avondale Rifles and Newtown Rifles in 1898. In Northland a similar amalgamation took place in 1911 after Sir Alexander Godley's reforms of the Territorial Cadre in 1910.

At the outbreak of World War I both the Auckland and Northland Regiments provided a 250-man company to the 1000 strong infantry battalion that was raised from the Auckland region. This was named the 1st Battalion Auckland Regiment with 2nd and 3rd Battalions being raised later in the war. Three Victoria Crosses were awarded to members of the Auckland Regiment in the Great War.

During World War II the Auckland and Northland Regiments contributed mainly to the 18th, 21st, 24th and 29th Battalions. The Regiments were awarded 10 battle honours in recognition of the role played by soldiers in these battalions. The Northland Regiment also has strong links to 28th Maori Battalion.

In 1948 the two regiments were reformed as part of the post-war Territorial Force. The 11/4 Artillery Battery can trace its lineage to 1/1 Battery and 4 Medium Battery of the New Zealand Artillery Regiment. Then, in 1964 they were amalgamated as a Battalion under the umbrella of a single Royal New Zealand Infantry Regiment and formed the current unit; the 3rd Auckland (Countess of Ranfurly's Own) Battalion Group.

The 3rd Battalion was formed by the amalgamation of the 3rd Auckland (Countess of Ranfurly's Own) and Northland Regiments in 1965. The amalgamation saw the new battalion become a TF battalion of the Royal New Zealand Infantry Regiment.

This was until the later reorganisation of 1999, which saw the TF battalions split from the RNZIR to become multi-function battalion groups. The Auckland and Northland Regiment became the 3rd Auckland (Countess of Ranfurly's Own) and Northland Battalion Group.

In recent years, members of the unit have once more been called upon to volunteer for overseas service. In 2000 and 2001, many members of the unit served with NZBatt 3, the third rotation of Kiwi troops in East Timor. Soldiers from the unit have also formed part of two deployments to the Solomon Islands, the first in 2007 and the second in 2008.

== Role ==
The role of the unit is to provide trained volunteers for overseas operations as required, as well as a trained pool of personnel to be able to respond to civil emergency tasks within New Zealand. In order to meet these roles the Unit trains regularly throughout the year. Training is broken down into three-hour training nights, regular weekend exercises and an annual two-week exercise.

The unit is a multi-combat role Battalion Group in which CO 3rd Auckland and Northland Battalion Group can call on a range of different arms to achieve an objective. It consists of Light Infantry; Light Artillery, Field Engineers, Medical Personal, Combat Service Support (CSS) and Communication support.

- Infantry – Alpha Company (Northland), Charlie Company (Auckland), Delta Company (Support)
- Artillery – 11/4 Battery, RNZA Attached to Papakura Military Camp
- Engineers – 1 North Troop; 1 Field Squadron, RNZE
- Medical – HST,1 Health Company, RNZAMC
- Logistics – 1 Logistics Company, RNZALR
- Band - Band of the Royal Regiment of New Zealand Artillery
- Signallers – 24 Sig Troop, 2 Sig Squadron, RNZSigs

== Battle honours ==
The following battle honours were authorised to be emblazoned on the colours:

- South Africa 1900–1902
- First World War: ANZAC, Krithia, Gallipoli 1915, Somme 1916–1918, Flers–Courcelette, Messines 1917, Passchendaele, Arras 1918, Bapaume, Canal Du Nord
- Second World War: Mount Olympus, Crete, Sidi Rezegh 1941, El Alamein, Tebaga Gap, Takrouna, The Sangro, Cassino 1, The Senio, Solomons

== Honorary Colonel ==
On 9 October 2007 former Governor-General of New Zealand Dame Catherine Tizard was appointed Honorary Colonel of the Regiment, a largely ceremonial role. In 2011 this appointment passed to Lieutenant Colonel (Retd) Grant Ellis ED, RNZIR, a former Commanding Officer of the regiment (1994–1997).

== Alliances ==
- United Kingdom – The Royal Anglian Regiment

== Freedoms ==
The regiment was granted the following freedoms:

- City of Whangārei (1964)
- City of Auckland (1966)
