= Galateo =

Galateo may refer to:

- Il Galateo, a 1558 book by Giovanni della Casa
- Antonio de Ferraris (1444–1517), an Italian scholar of Greek ethnicity
- Alberto Galateo (1912–1961), an Argentine footballer
- Galateo, Toa Alta, Puerto Rico, a barrio of Toa Alta, Puerto Rico

== See also ==
- Galatea (disambiguation)
