= Northland Regiment =

Former territorial infantry regiment of the New Zealand Military Forces

15th (North Auckland) Regiment North Auckland Regiment Northland Regiment
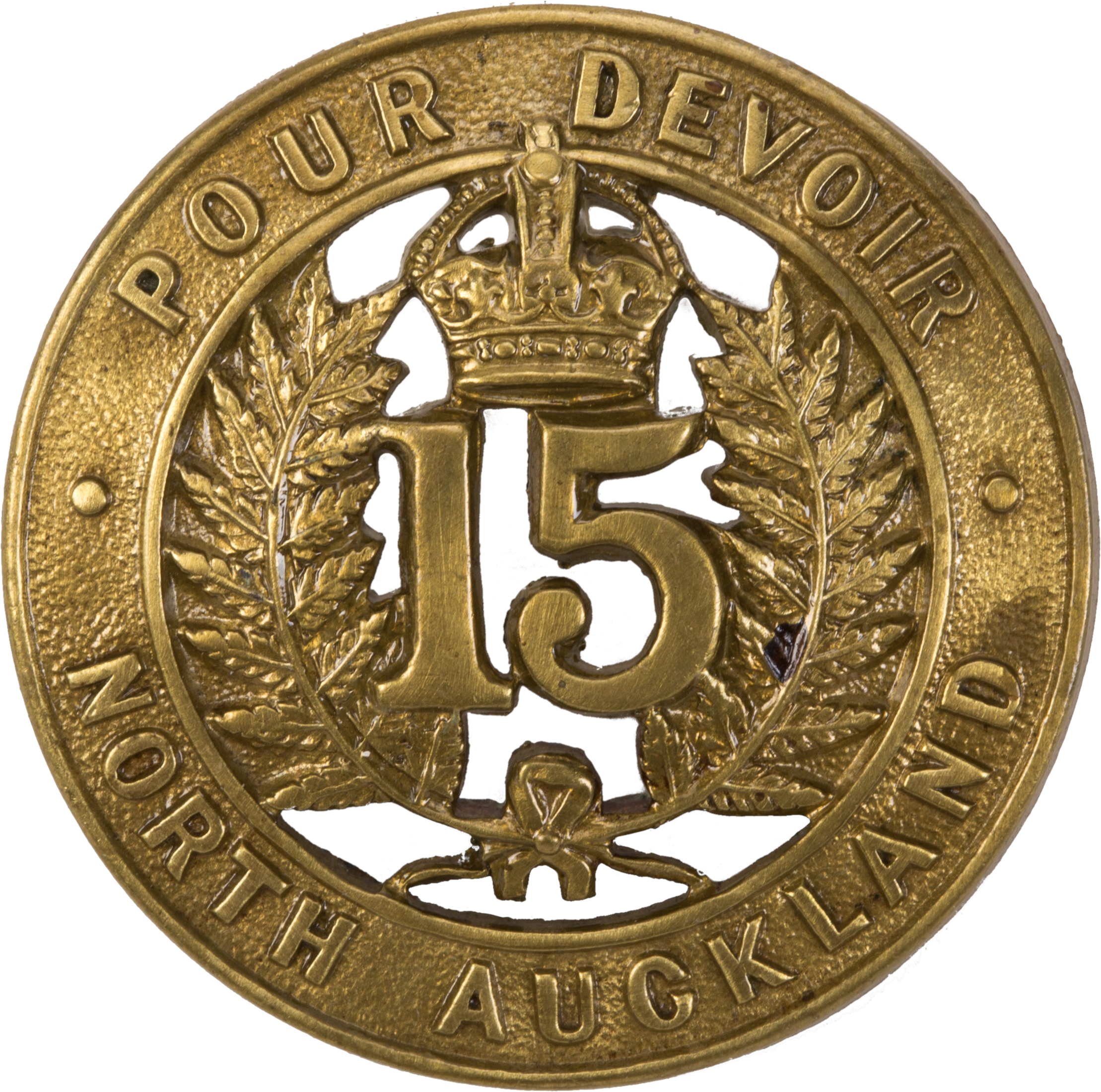
- Cap badge of the North Auckland Regiment
- Active: 1911–1964
- Country: New Zealand
- Branch: New Zealand Army
- Type: Infantry
- Garrison/HQ: Whangārei
- Motto: Pour Devoir (French: "For Duty")
- Engagements: First World War; Second World War

Commanders
- Colonel-in-Chief: Princess Margaret (1955–1964)

The Northland Regiment was a territorial infantry regiment of the New Zealand Military Forces. The Regiment was formed in 1911 and provided service companies to the Auckland Infantry Regiment during the First World War. Men from the Regiment also served with the 18th, 21st, 24th and 29th battalions of the 2nd New Zealand Expeditionary Force during the Second World War. The regiment was amalgamated with the Auckland Regiment (Countess of Ranfurly's Own) in 1964, becoming 3rd Battalion (Auckland (Countess of Ranfurly's Own) and Northland), Royal New Zealand Infantry Regiment.

== History ==
The 15th (North Auckland) Regiment was formed on 17 March 1911 as part of a reorganisation of New Zealand's military which saw the old Volunteer Force converted into a Territorial Force based on compulsory military training. The regiment was completely new and had no lineage to units of the Volunteer Force.

At the outbreak of the First World War in August 1914, the decision was made to form a New Zealand infantry brigade of four battalions from the existing territorial regiments. The 15th (North Auckland) Regiment provided the 15th (North Auckland) Company to the Auckland Battalion, which saw service in the Gallipoli Campaign. Following the evacuation from Gallipoli in 1916, the Auckland Battalion was expanded to a regiment of two battalions. The Auckland Infantry Regiment would see action on the western front, engaging in the battles of the Somme, Messines, Passchendaele, German Spring Offensive and the Hundred Days Offensive. A third battalion was also raised in 1917, but was disbanded in 1918 due to manpower shortages. Both the 2nd and 3rd Battalions were organised along the same lines as the 1st Battalion, each with their own 15th (North Auckland) Company. The Auckland Infantry Regiment was disbanded at the end of the war.

In 1921, the New Zealand territorial regiments were reorganised into larger regiments, similar to those of the First World War, with the 15th (North Auckland) Regiment becoming the 3rd Battalion, Auckland Regiment. The amalgamations were short lived and in 1923, the previous organisation was reverted to, although the ordinals were dropped and the 3rd Battalion was redesignated as the North Auckland Regiment.

Another reorganisation occurred in 1937 when the North Auckland Regiment was reduced to a depot and supplied a single rifle company to the 1st Composite Battalion. The battalion also had rifle companies from the Hauraki and Waikato Regiments. The composite system was abandoned in May 1939, just prior to the outbreak of the Second World War and the territorial regiments were brought up to full battalion strength.

During the Second World War, the North Auckland Regiment remained in New Zealand for home defence. A 2nd, 3rd and 4th Battalion were formed in February 1942 by redesignating the 6th, 7th and 8th Battalions of the National Military Reserve respectively. The 3rd Battalion was redesignated as the 2nd Māori Battalion in June 1942. The 1st and 3rd Battalions (later 2nd Maori Battalion) became part of 12th Infantry Brigade of the 1st New Zealand Division and were expected to provide a mobile response to any invasion throughout the country. The 2nd and 4th Battalions remained stationed in Northland as stationary "fortress troops". The territorial forces were stood down in June 1943 and the 2nd and 4th Battalions were formally disbanded in April 1944.

Men from the regiment saw active service overseas with the 18th, 21st, 24th and 29th battalions of the 2nd New Zealand Expeditionary Force. The 18th, 21st and 24th battalions formed part of the 2nd New Zealand Division and saw action in Greece, Crete, North Africa, Tunisia and Italy. The 29th Battalion was deployed to the Pacific with the 3rd New Zealand Division and saw combat at the Treasury Islands.

The North Auckland Regiment was redesignated as the Northland Regiment in 1951 to better reflect its recruiting area and in 1955 Princess Margaret was appointed Colonel-in-Chief of the regiment.

A reorganisation of the Territorial Force in 1961 saw the number of infantry battalions reduced from nine to six. To avoid the disbandment of any regiments, three regiments, including the Northland Regiment, became "recessed". The recessed regiments would not raise a battalion and only consist of a regimental headquarters, a band and two rifle companies. The two companies would wear the cap badge of the recessed regiment, but be operationally part of a battalion of one of the non-recessed regiments. The Northland Regiment therefore formed C and D companies of the Auckland Regiment.

In 1964 all of the territorial infantry regiments were merged into the Royal New Zealand Infantry Regiment. The Northland Regiment was amalgamated with the Auckland Regiment (Countess of Ranfurly's Own) in 1964, becoming 3rd Battalion (Auckland (Countess of Ranfurly's Own) and Northland).

== Battle Honours ==
The North Auckland regiment was presented a stand of colours by the Governor-General, Viscount Galway, at Dargaville in 1937. The following battle honours earned during the First World War were authorised to be emblazoned on the colours:

- Flers-Courcelette
- Messines 1917
- Passendale
- Bapaume 1918
- Havrincourt
- Canal du Nord
- Cambrai 1918
- Krithia
- Landing at Anzac
- Defence of Anzac

The regiment also inherited the battle honours of the 18th (until 5 October 1942), 21st, 24th and 29th Battalions. The following battle honours were authorised to be emblazoned on the colours:

- Mount Olympus
- Crete
- Tobruk 1941
- El Alamein
- Tebaga Gap
- Enfidaville
- The Sangro
- Cassino I
- The Senio
- Solomons

== Alliances ==
The Northland Regiment was allied with the following regiment:

- United Kingdom – Northamptonshire Regiment
