= National Military Reserve (New Zealand) =

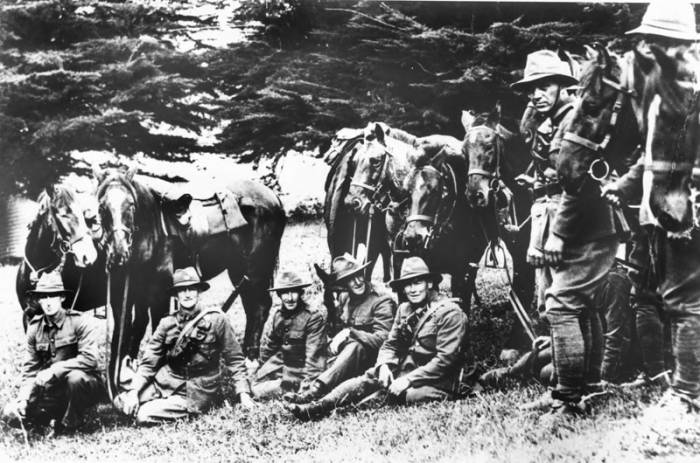
- No. 3 Independent Mounted Rifles Squadron
- Active: 1939–1942
- Country: New Zealand
- Branch: New Zealand Military Forces
- Type: Reserve Force

The National Military Reserve was a reserve force of the New Zealand Military Forces. It was formed just prior to the Second World War and intended to provide a reserve pool of manpower to supplement the Territorial Force. The National Military Reserve consisted of a number of independent infantry companies and battalions, as well as independent Mounted rifle squadrons. In 1942 the New Zealand Government rationalised the reserve system. The National Military Reserve was disbanded and most of the constituent units were transferred to the Territorial Force.

== History ==
By 1939, the New Zealand Government was becoming increasingly concerned about the likelihood of war in Europe. It was therefore decided to expand the New Zealand Military Forces and in May 1939 a major reorganisation was undertaken. The territorial forces were expanded and a new reserve force called the National Military Reserve was formed. The National Military Reserve was to act as a pool of manpower for the Territorial Force in the event of war and also provide a force of less able men for menial work. Recruits were designated into three classes:

- Class I: men aged 20–35 with two years experience in the territorial force
- Class II: men aged 35–55 with regular or NZEF experience
- Class III: any other men aged 33–55

With the out break of war on 3 September 1939, the National Military Reserve was activated. The majority of men in class I were immediately transferred to the Territorial Force, while the roughly 11,000 class II men were called up to provide garrison troops to defend ports and other key points in New Zealand. In July 1940, the National Military Reserve was organised into independent squadrons of mounted rifles, independent companies and battalions of infantry. Further units were raised throughout 1940 and 1941 and by January 1942 the establishment of the National Military Reserve was 21,261. New Zealand was suffering from manpower shortages and such a large force could not be maintained. Consequently, 12 of the independent companies were disbanded, however a larger change soon followed. At the beginning of 1942 the New Zealand Home defence forces consisted of three organisations: the Territorial force, the National Military Reserve and the Home Guard. The government felt that this was too complicated and decided to simplify the home defence forces into two lines: the first line (i.e. the Territorial Force) of fitter men and the second line (i.e. the Home Guard). Consequently, the NMR was disbanded and its units transferred to the Territorial Force. The Territorial force itself was stood down in 1943 and by April 1944 all the former National Military Reserve units had been disbanded.

== List of units of the National Military reserve ==
=== Mounted Rifle Squadrons ===
All 9 independent mounted rifles companies were formed on 1 July 1940. They were transferred to the Territorial Force on 10 January 1942 and later attached to the Home Guard in May 1943.

Company	Location
1st	Northland
2nd	Kaipara
3rd	Hauraki
4th	East Coast
5th	Tararua
6th	Marlborough
7th	Nelson
8th	Ellesmere
9th	Taieri

=== Independent Infantry Companies ===
A total of 21 independent infantry companies were formed, of which 12 were disbanded on 1 January 1942, and the remainder transferred to the territorial force on 2 February 1942

Company	Location	Date formed	Fate
1st	Whanagarei	1 July 1940	Attached to North Auckland Regiment
2nd	Russell	1 July 1940	Disbanded
3rd	Whangaroa	1 July 1940	Disbanded
4th	Tauranga	1 July 1940	Disbanded
5th	Thames	23 September 1940	Attached to Hauraki Regiment
6th	Hamilton	23 September 1940	Disbanded
7th	Wairoa	23 September 1940	Attached to Hawkes Bay Regiment
8th	Gisborne	1 July 1940	Attached to Hawkes Bay Regiment
9th	Napier	1 July 1940	Disbanded
10th	New Plymouth	1 July 1940	Disbanded
11th	Wanganui	1 July 1940	Disbanded
12th	Palmerston North	23 September 1940	Disbanded
13th	Hastings	23 September 1940	Disbanded
14th	Paekakariki/Porirua	23 September 1940	Disbanded
15th	Nelson	1 July 1940	Attached to Nelson, Marlborough and West Coast Regiment
16th	Blenheim/Picton	1 July 1940	Disbanded
17th	Greymouth/Westport	1 July 1940	Attached to Nelson, Marlborough and West Coast Regiment
18th	Timaru	1 July 1940	Disbanded
19th	Oamaru	1 July 1940	Attached to Otago Regiment
20th	Bluff	1 July 1940	Attached to Otago Regiment
21st	Westport	1 November 1941	Attached to Nelson, Marlborough and West Coast Regiment

=== Infantry Battalions ===
A total of 22 infantry battalions were formed and were transferred to the territorial force on 2 February 1942

Battalion	Location	Date formed	Redesignated as
1st	Auckland	1 July 1940	4th Battalion, Auckland Regiment
2nd	Wellington	1 July 1940	3rd Battalion, Wellington Regiment
3rd	Christchurch	1 July 1940	3rd Battalion, Canterbury Regiment
4th	Dunedin	1 July 1940	2nd Battalion, Otago Regiment
5th	Auckland	1 November 1941	5th Battalion, Auckland Regiment
6th	Whangarei	1 November 1941	2nd Battalion, North Auckland Regiment
7th	Bay of Islands	1 November 1941	3rd Battalion, North Auckland Regiment (Note: redesignated as 2nd Māori Battalion in June 1942)
8th	Bay of Islands	1 November 1941	4th Battalion, North Auckland Regiment
9th	Hamilton	1 November 1941	2nd Battalion, Waikato Regiment
10th	Tauranga	1 November 1941	2nd Battalion, Hauraki Regiment
11th	Wellington	1 November 1941	4th Battalion, Wellington Regiment
12th	Napier	1 November 1941	2nd Battalion, Hawke's Bay Regiment
13th	Wanganui	1 November 1941	2nd Battalion, Wellington West Coast Regiment
14th	New Plymouth	1 November 1941	2nd Battalion, Taranaki Regiment
15th	Christchurch	1 November 1941	4th Battalion, Canterbury Regiment
16th	Christchurch	1 November 1941	5th Battalion, Canterbury Regiment
17th	Dunedin	1 November 1941	3rd Battalion, Otago Regiment
18th	Palmerston North	1 November 1941	3rd Battalion, Wellington West Coast Regiment
19th	Blenheim	1 November 1941	2nd Battalion, Nelson, Marlborough and West Coast Regiment
20th	Timaru	1 November 1941	7th Battalion, Canterbury Regiment
21st	Blenheim	1 November 1941	3rd Battalion, Nelson, Marlborough and West Coast Regiment
22nd	Christchurch	1 November 1941	6th Battalion, Canterbury Regiment

== Notes ==
Footnotes

Citations

References

- Cooke, Peter (2016). Defending New Zealand: Ramparts on the Seas 1840-1950s. Wellington: Defence of New Zealand Study Group. ISBN 0-473-06833-8.
- Cooke, Peter; Crawford, John (2011). The Territorials. Auckland: Random House. ISBN 978-1-86979-446-0.
