= 1943 New Year Honours (New Zealand) =

Annual awards for New Zealanders

The 1943 New Year Honours in New Zealand were appointments by King George VI to various orders and honours in recognition of war service by New Zealanders. The awards celebrated the passing of 1942 and the beginning of 1943, and were announced on 1 January 1943. No civilian awards were made.

The recipients of honours are displayed here as they were styled before their new honour.

== Order of the British Empire ==
=== Commander (CBE) ===
Military division, additional

- Lieutenant-Colonel (temporary Brigadier) Henry Esau Avery CMG DSO – New Zealand Military Forces; of Wellington.
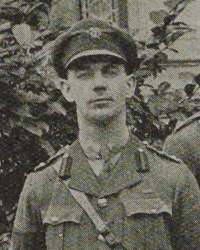
Henry Avery

=== Officer (OBE) ===
Military division, additional

- Major (temporary Lieutenant-Colonel) George Frederick Bertrand – New Zealand Military Forces; of New Plymouth.
- Wing Commander Esmond Allen Gibson – Royal New Zealand Air Force; of Wellington.
- Commander Andrew Douglas Holden – Royal New Zealand Naval Reserve.
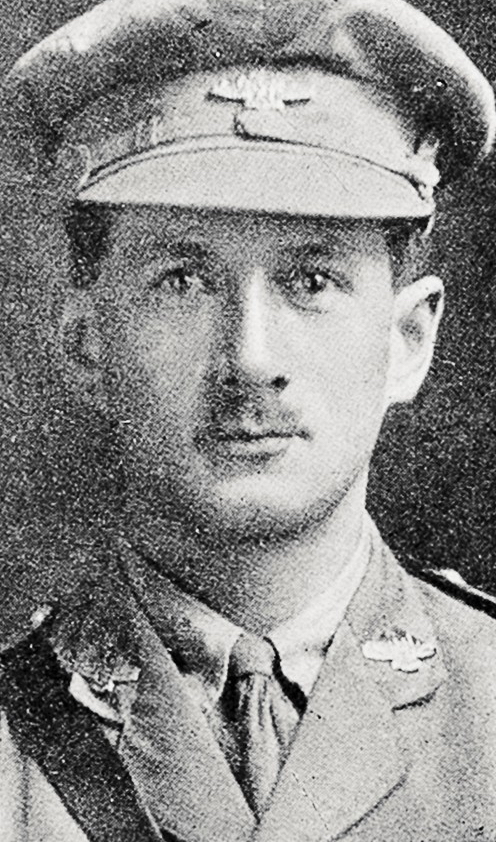
George Bertrand

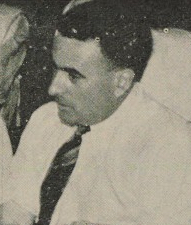
Esmond Gibson

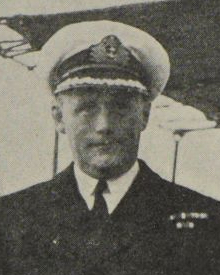
Andrew Holden

=== Member (MBE) ===
Military division, additional

- Commissioned Gunner William Robert Corner – Royal Navy.
- Squadron Sergeant-Major (Warrant Officer Class II) Eric William Gerrie Hutton Forsyth, New Zealand Military Forces; of Auckland.
- Flight Lieutenant Frank Lionel Goldsmith – Royal New Zealand Air Force; of Christchurch.
- Warrant Officer Class II Martin Te Takahi McRae – New Zealand Military Forces; of Ohinemutu.
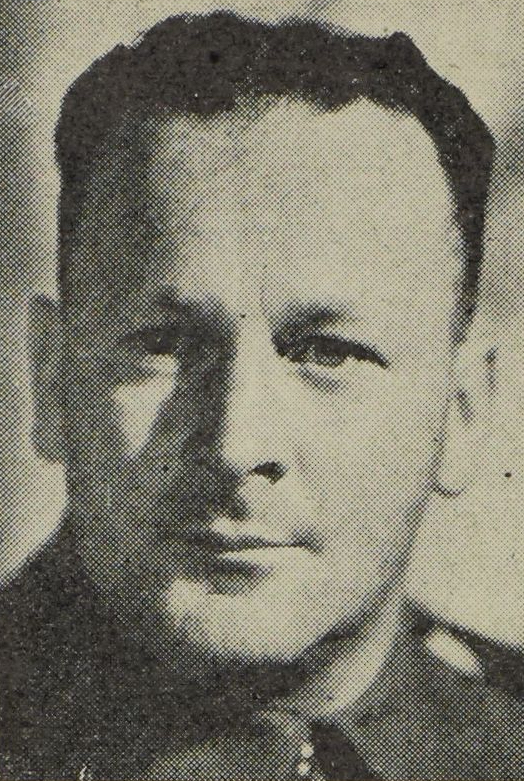
Eric Forsyth

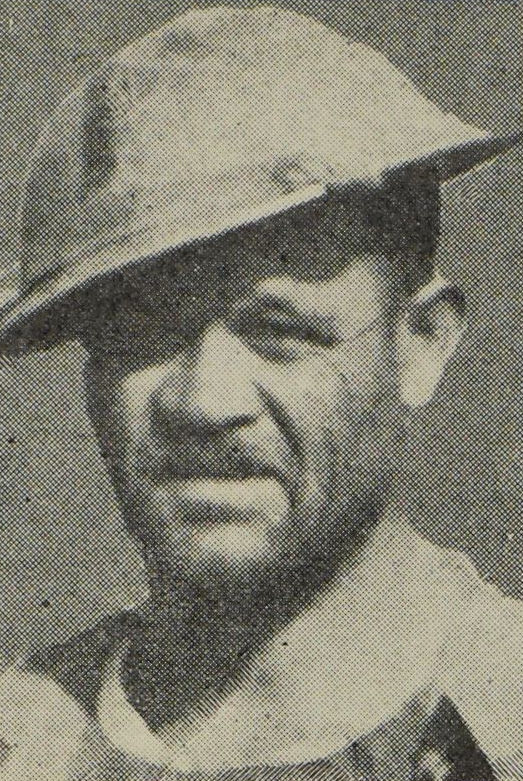
Martin McRae

== British Empire Medal (BEM) ==
Military division

- Flight Sergeant (now Pilot Officer) Walter Andrew Chandler – Royal New Zealand Air Force; of Christchurch.
- Chief Engine Room Artificer Charles Thomas John Foster – Royal Navy.
- Warrant Officer Gordon Kells – Royal New Zealand Air Force; of Wellington.
- Corporal Leslie Maddern – New Zealand Military Forces; of Cape Colville.
- Supply Chief Petty Officer John Fleetwood Potts – Royal Navy.
- Sergeant John Rennie – New Zealand Military Forces; of Christchurch.

== Air Force Cross (AFC) ==
- Squadron Leader James Duff Hewett – Royal New Zealand Air Force; of Wellington.
- Squadron Leader Henry Campbell Walker – Royal New Zealand Air Force; of Palmerston North.
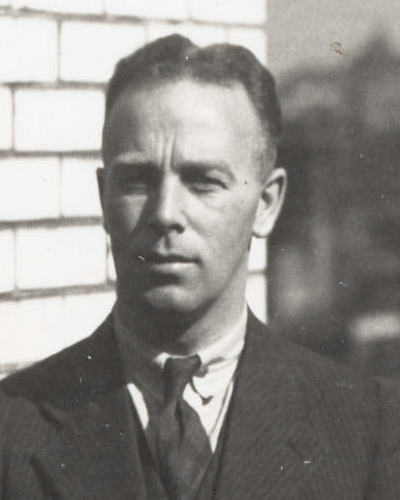
Henry Walker

== Mention in despatches ==
- Acting Flight Lieutenant William Arthur Coleman Ball – Royal New Zealand Air Force; of Wellington.
- Pilot Officer Ivan Oswald Breckon – Royal New Zealand Air Force; of Auckland.
- Flight Lieutenant Richard Broadbent – Royal New Zealand Air Force; of Auckland.
- Flying Officer Charles Henry Butt – Royal New Zealand Air Force; of Hamilton. (Note: Since deceased)
- Pilot Officer Alan Edward Coates – Royal New Zealand Air Force; of Auckland. (Note: Since missing)
- Flight Lieutenant Donald Belton Collie – Royal New Zealand Air Force; of Invercargill.
- Acting Flight Lieutenant Phillip Ronald Coney – Royal New Zealand Air Force; of Auckland.
- Pilot Officer Roy Elliott Hanlon – Royal New Zealand Air Force; of Hamilton.
- Flight Lieutenant Richard George Hartshorn – Royal New Zealand Air Force; of Auckland.
- Flying Officer Sefton Douglas Lisle Hood – Royal New Zealand Air Force; of Christchurch.
- Sergeant Cyril Patrick Francis Hughes – Royal New Zealand Air Force; of Reefton.
- Pilot Officer Noel Robert Shakespeare Humphreys – Royal New Zealand Air Force; of Wellington.
- Flying Officer Lindsay James – Royal New Zealand Air Force; of Whangārei.
- Pilot Officer Robert Keith Walker – Royal New Zealand Air Force; of Southland.
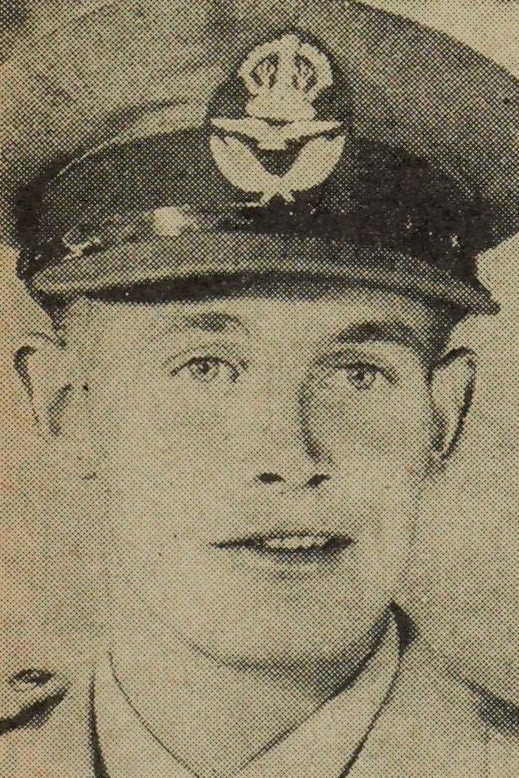
William Ball

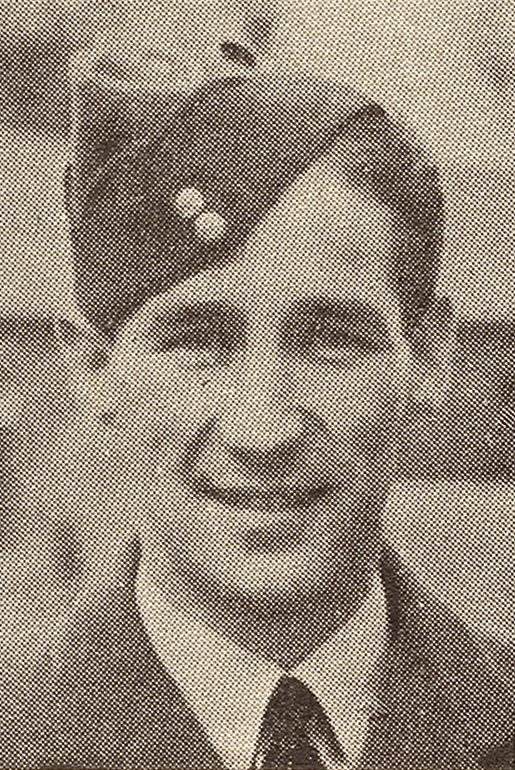
Richard Broadbent

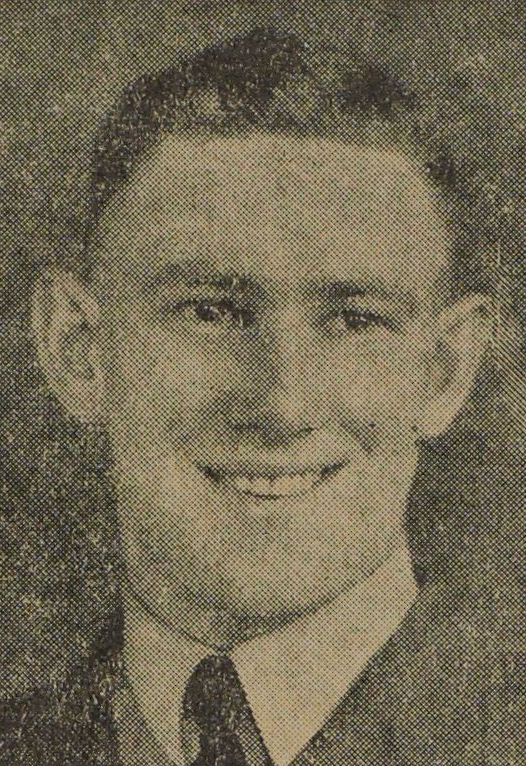
Charles Butt

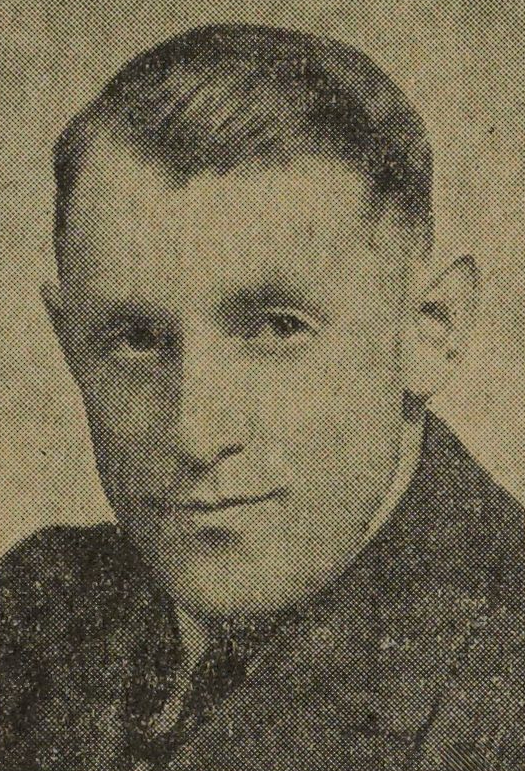
Alan Coates

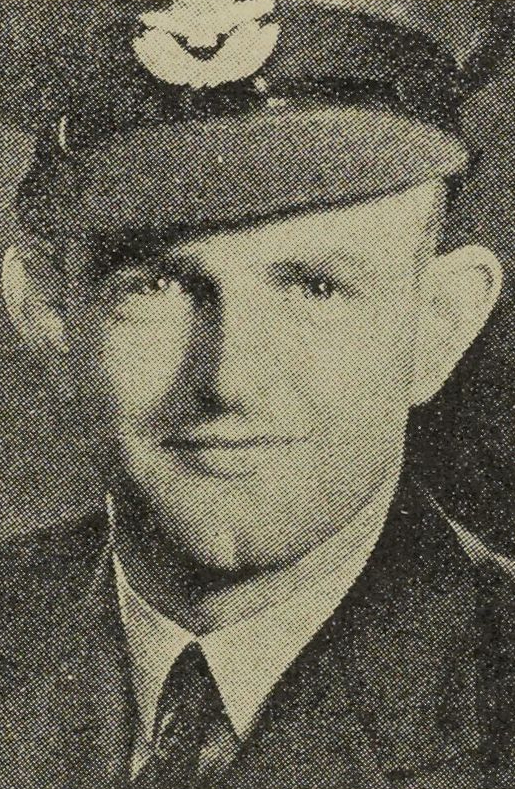
Roy Hanlon

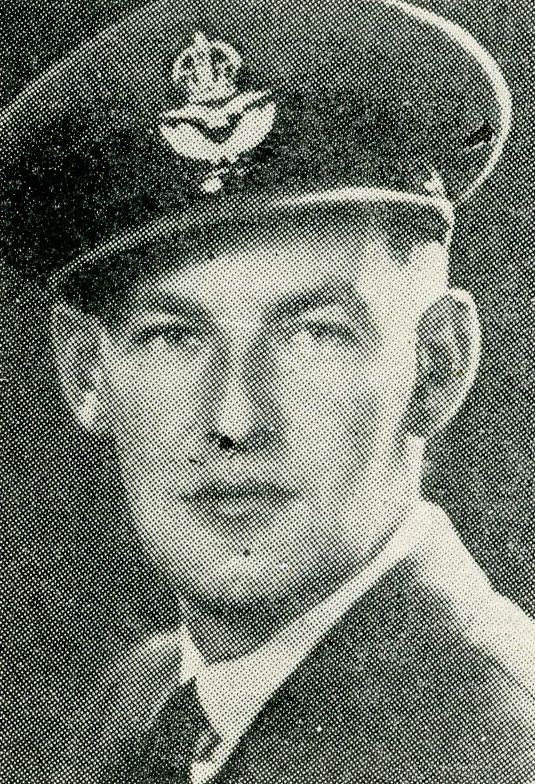
Lisle Hood

== King's Commendation for Brave Conduct ==
- Warrant Officer Thomas Harold Hatchard – Royal New Zealand Air Force.
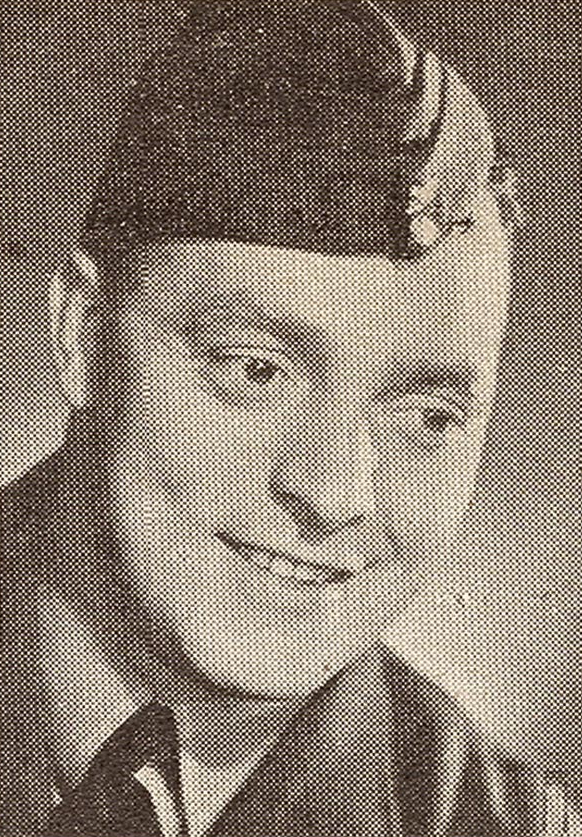
Thomas Hatchard
