= 1st Field Regiment, Royal New Zealand Artillery =

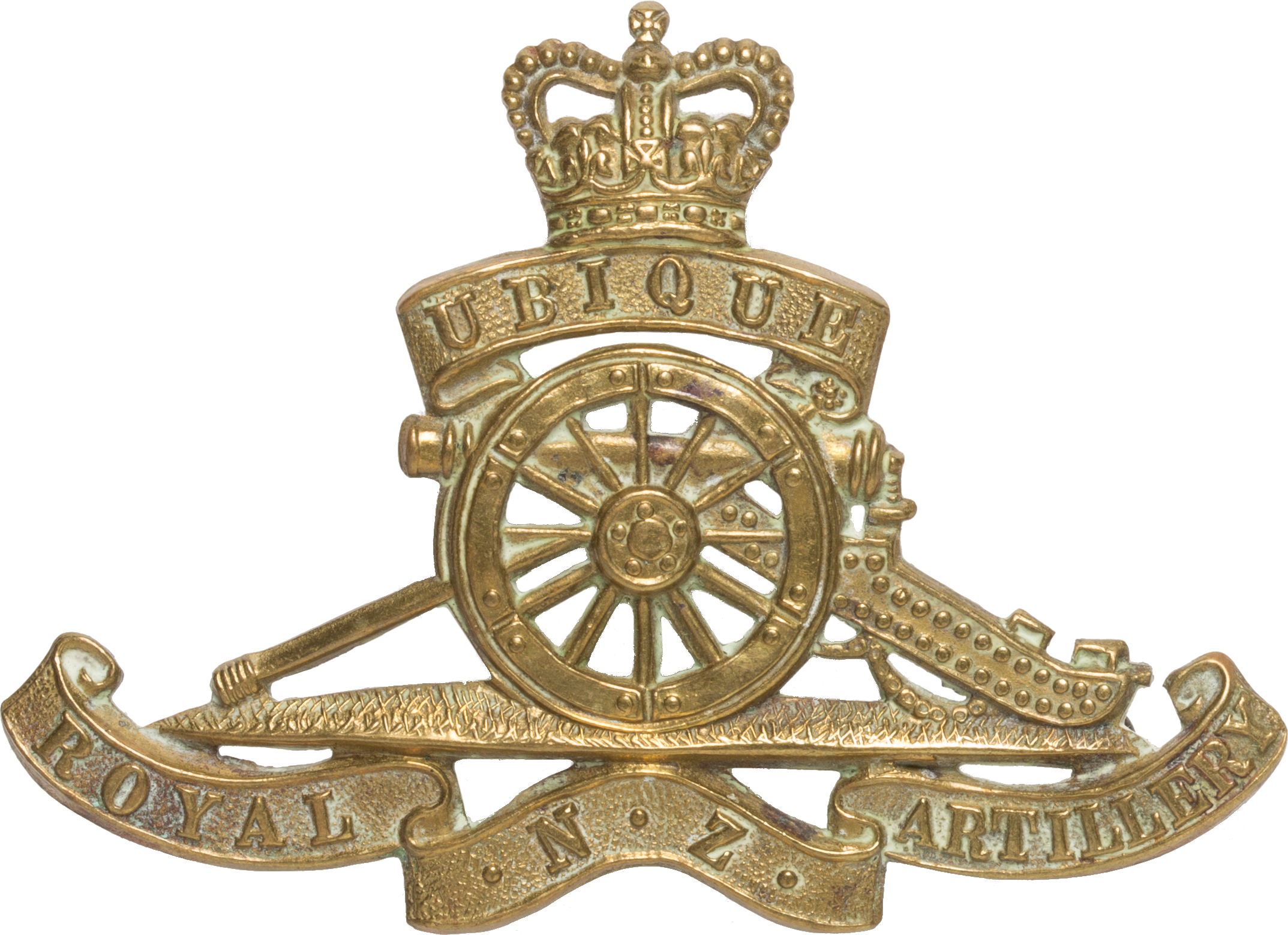
- Cap badge of the Royal New Zealand Artillery
- Active: 1921–1964
- Country: New Zealand
- Branch: New Zealand Army
- Type: Field Artillery
- Garrison/HQ: Auckland

The 1st Field Regiment, Royal New Zealand Artillery was a territorial field artillery regiment of the New Zealand Army. It was originally formed as 1st Field Artillery Brigade in 1921 and brought the independent batteries of the Auckland Area under a single command. In 1940, the New Zealand territorial artillery brigades were redesignated as regiments and the former batteries became troops within new, larger batteries During the Second World War, the 1st Field Regiment remained in New Zealand for home defense as part of the 1st Division. After the war, the regiment remained a part of the territorial force until it was disbanded in 1964.

== Notes ==
Citations

References

- Henderson, Alan; Green, David; Cooke, Peter D. F. (2008). The Gunners:A History of New Zealand Artillery. Auckland: Reed Publishing. ISBN 978-07900-1141-7.
- Cooke, Peter D. F. (2016). Defending New Zealand: Ramparts on the Seas 1840-1950s. Wellington: Defence of New Zealand Study Group. ISBN 0-473-06833-8.
