= Galathée =

Galathée is the French form of the feminine given name Galatea. It may refer to:

- French frigate Galathée (1779), a French Navy sailing ship
- Galathée-class frigate, of which the frigate was the lead ship
- Galathée (opera), an 1852 opera by Victor Massé
- Galathée, a 1911 film directed by Georges Denola
- Galathée, an underwater habitat

== See also ==
- Galatea (disambiguation)
