= 2nd Māori Battalion =

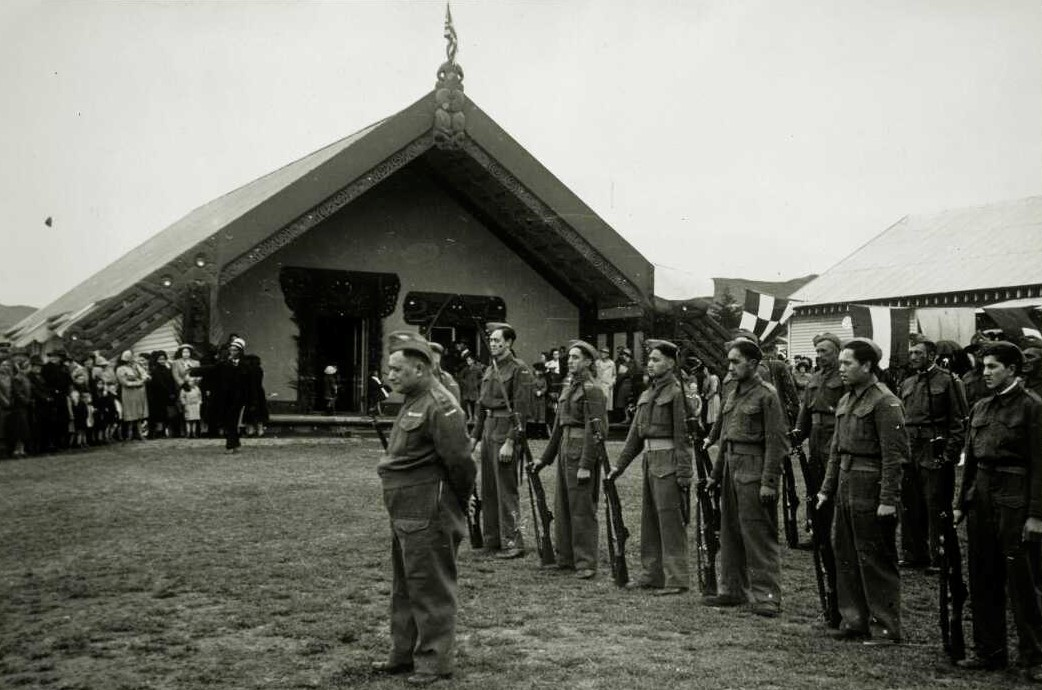
- 2nd Maori Battalion at the posthumous award of the Victoria Cross to Moana-Nui-a-Kiwa Ngarimu
- Active: 1942–1944
- Country: New Zealand
- Branch: New Zealand Military Forces
- Type: Infantry
- Part of: 1st Division

Commanders
- Notable commanders: George Bertrand

The 2nd Māori Battalion was a territorial battalion of the New Zealand Military Forces during the Second World War. The battalion was formed in February 1942 as the 3rd battalion, North Auckland Regiment by converting a battalion of the National Military Reserve. The 2nd Māori Battalion garrisoned fortress areas in Northland and also provided training for personnel who would be latter posted overseas with 28th (Māori) Battalion. It was disbanded in 1944 along with most other territorial units.

== History ==
In 1942, at the request of Sir Āpirana Ngata, the war cabinet authorised the formation of a Māori territorial battalion. The new Māori unit was to be the 3rd Battalion, North Auckland Regiment which was formed by redesignating the 7th Battalion of the National Military Reserve in February 1942. The Battalion underwent a name change in June and became the 2nd Māori Battalion (the "first" battalion being the 28th (Māori) Battalion of the 2nd New Zealand Expeditionary Force). The companies were organised along tribal lines. A Company was composed of Māori from Northland, Auckland, Waikato, Taranaki, Wairarapa, Wellington and the South Island; B Company from Rotorua, the Bay of Plenty, Thames and Hawkes Bay; while C Company was recruited exclusively from Ngāti Porou. Both D (support) and HQ Companies were made up of Māori from all iwi. The 2nd Māori Battalion became part of the 12th Infantry Brigade of the 1st Division and had its camp setup at the Remuera Estate, near Ōhaeawai in Northland. Despite discussions of sending the 2nd Battalion (or a hypothetical 3rd Māori battalion) overseas, it remained in New Zealand for the rest of the war. The 2nd Māori provided training for reinforcements to the 28th Battalion and constructed and manned coastal defences in Northland. In June 1943 the war in the pacific was looking favourable for the Allies and a general stand-down was ordered in New Zealand. The 2nd Māori Battalion's camp was dismantled in August and by the end of the year most of the personnel had been transferred to other units or demobilized. The Battalion was formally disbanded in April 1944.

== Notes ==
Citations

References

- Cooke, Peter; Crawford, J. (2011). The Territorials. Auckland: Random House. ISBN 978-1-86979-446-0.
- Cooke, Peter; Gray, John; Stead, Ken (2010). Auckland Infantry. Auckland: 3rd Battalion (Auckland (Countess of Ranfurly's Own) and Northland) Regimental Association. ISBN 978-0-473-17452-1.
