= 1st Division (New Zealand) =

- Active: 1 November 1941 – 1 April 1944
- Disbanded: 1 April 1944
- Country: New Zealand
- Branch: New Zealand Military Forces
- Role: Home defence
- Part of: Northern Military District
- Engagements: World War II

Commanders
- Notable commanders: Harold Eric Barrowclough (1942)

The 1st Division was one of three New Zealand Army home defence divisions formed during World War II. The unit was established on 1 November 1941 and was responsible for protecting the northern region of New Zealand's North Island from invasion. The 1st Division was placed on alert during the early months of the Pacific War, but no threat developed. The division was greatly reduced in size during 1943 and was disbanded on 1 April 1944.

== History ==
As part of the preparations for the possible outbreak of war in the Pacific, the defensive forces stationed in New Zealand were expanded in late 1941. On 1 November, three new brigade headquarters were raised (taking the total in the New Zealand Military Forces, as the New Zealand Army was then known, to seven), and three divisional headquarters were established to coordinate the units located in the Northern, Central and Southern Military Districts. The division in the Northern Military District was designated the Northern Division, and comprised the 1st and 12th Brigade Groups. The 1st Brigade Group had been formed prior to World War II; the 12th Brigade Group was one of the new headquarters; both of these units were part of the Territorial Force and were manned by part-time reservists.

The New Zealand Military Forces was further expanded following the outbreak of the Pacific War. The Territorial Force was fully mobilised on 10 January 1942, and reinforced by 7000 men who had originally enlisted in the New Zealand Expeditionary Force for overseas service. The role of the Territorial Force was to counter any Japanese landings in New Zealand, and it was organised into both mobile and fortress units. The Home Guard would support the Territorial units in the event of an invasion. During early 1942, camps were constructed for the 1st Brigade Group in South Auckland and the 12th Brigade Group at Kaikohe. The 1st Brigade subsequently moved to a camp near Warkworth. Later in the war, a divisional camp was constructed near Whangārei.

Major General Harold Eric Barrowclough assumed command of the Northern Division in April 1942. Barrowclough had led the 6th Infantry Brigade during the Greek Campaign and subsequent fighting in North Africa, and had been posted back to New Zealand to command the forces in Fiji. However, on arrival in New Zealand he was assigned to command the Northern Division, to his displeasure. At about this time, the three divisions stationed in New Zealand were transformed into mobile formations and renamed; the Northern Division became the 1st Division; the divisions in the Central and Southern Military District were redesignated as the 4th and 5th Divisions respectively. As part of this change, the 1st Division's headquarters was expanded and relocated to the Northland Region. During mid-1942, the Bay of Islands Fortress formed part of the 1st Division, and Barrowclough treated it as the division's third brigade, though the fortress units were static. In August, Barrowclough was appointed to lead the 3rd New Zealand Division after its commander was killed in an accident. Until August and September, Territorial Force units across New Zealand were held at eight days notice to respond to an invasion, and defensive positions along the country's coastline were permanently manned.

The forces stationed in New Zealand were considerably reduced as the threat of invasion passed. During early 1943 each of the three home defence divisions were cut from 22,358 to 11,530 men. The non-divisional units suffered even greater reductions. The New Zealand Government ordered a general stand-down of the defensive forces in the country on 28 June, which led to further reductions in the strength of units and a lower state of readiness. By the end of the year almost all of the Territorial Force personnel had been demobilised (though they retained their uniforms and equipment), and only 44 soldiers were posted to the three divisional and seven brigade headquarters. The war situation continued to improve and the 1st Division, along with the other two divisions and almost all the remaining Territorial Force units, was disbanded on 1 April 1944.

== Structure ==
In June 1942 the 1st Division comprised

- 1st Infantry Brigade
  - 3rd Battalion, Auckland Regiment
  - 1st Battalion, Hauraki Regiment
  - 1st Battalion, Waikato Regiment
- 12th Infantry Brigade
  - 1st Battalion, North Auckland Regiment
  - 2nd Māori Battalion
- Divisional Troops
  - 3rd Light Armoured Fighting Vehicle Regiment (Auckland (East Coast) Mounted Rifles)
  - 11th Light Armoured Fighting Vehicle Regiment (North Auckland Mounted Rifles)
- Divisional Artillery
  - 1st Field Regiment, New Zealand Artillery
  - 20th Field Regiment, New Zealand Artillery

== Bibliography ==
- Cooke, Peter; Crawford, John (2011). The Territorials: The History of the Territorial and Volunteer Forces of New Zealand. Auckland: Random House. ISBN 978-1-8697-9446-0.
- Cooke, Peter D. F. (2016). Defending New Zealand: Ramparts on the Seas 1840-1950s. Wellington: Defence of New Zealand Study Group. ISBN 0-473-06833-8.
