= Galata (disambiguation) =

Galata is a district of Istanbul, Turkey.

Galata may also refer to:

Also in Turkey

- Galata Tower
- Galata Bridge, the first bascule bridge in the world

In Greece

- Galatas, Aetolia-Acarnania, a village in the municipality Nafpaktia, Aetolia-Acarnania
- Galatas, Chania, a village in the municipality Chania, Crete
- Galatas, Corinthia, a village in Corinthia
- Galatas, Heraklion, a village in the municipality Minoa Pediada, Heraklion regional unit
  - Galatas Palace, a Minoan archaeological site
- Galatas, Preveza, a village in the municipality Ziros, Preveza regional unit
- Galatas, Troizina, a town in the northeastern part of the Peloponnese

In Romania

- Galata, Iași, a neighbourhood of Iași, Romania
- Galata Monastery

In Bulgaria

- Galata, Lovech Province, a village in Lovech Province, Bulgaria
- Galata, Varna, a neighbourhood of Varna, Bulgaria
  - Galata (headland), a rocky headland of the Black Sea at Varna, Bulgaria

In the USA

- Galata, Montana, a prairie town in north central Montana

In Cyprus

- Galata, Cyprus, a village in the Troodos mountains

== Other uses ==
- Galata (horse)
- Galata (film), a 2014 Indian Telugu romantic comedy film

== See also ==
- Galatea (disambiguation)
- Galatia (disambiguation)
