= List of ships named Galatea =

A number of ships have been named after Galatea of ancient Greek mythology. Ships named Galatea or Galathea include:

== Naval ships ==
- HMS Galatea, various Royal Navy ships
- HDMS Galathea, three Royal Danish Navy ships
- USS Galatea (1863) was a steamship originally built for merchant service but purchased by the Union Navy before completion and converted into a gunboat for the American Civil War.
- USS Galatea (SP-714) was a private yacht built in 1914 and purchased by the United States Navy for use as a patrol boat during World War I.
- Italian submarine Galatea was an Italian Navy Sirena-class submarine launched in 1933 and struck in 1948.
- Spanish training ship Galatea served from 1922 to 1981; she was previously a barque-rigged cargo ship built in 1896, and is now the museum ship Glenlee, berthed in Glasgow.

== Other ==
- Galatea (1793 ship), of 332 tons (bm) was a sailing vessel launched at Whitby in 1793. She became a West Indiaman and in 1795 participated as a transport in the British invasion of the West Indies. A French privateer captured her in 1801 in sight of Jamaica.
- SS Galatea (1864) was a 1,400-ton American passenger-cargo coastal steamship.
- Galatea (yacht), built in 1885, was the 1886 America's Cup challenger.
- THV Galatea is a lighthouse tender of the United Kingdom launched in 2006.
