= Acis (disambiguation) =

Acis is a character in Greek mythology

Acis or ACIS may refer to:

- Acis (river), river in Sicily, Italy
- Acis (coral), a genus of coral in the family Plexauridae
- Acis (plant), a genus of flowering plants
- ACIS (Alan, Charles, Ian's System), a solid modelling geometric modeling kernel that several CAD packages use
- Advanced CCD Imaging Spectrometer, an instrument on NASA's Chandra X-ray Observatory
- Algoma Central Railway, which has the reporting mark "ACIS"
- Acoustic Control Induction System, a Variable Length Intake Manifold|variable induction system developed by Toyota
- Applied Climate Information System, a software system developed by NOAA's Regional Climate Centers (RCC)
- ACIS (Adenocarcinoma in situ) on pap smear, equal to grade 3 cervical intraepithelial neoplasia
- ACIS, a professional designation for associates of the Institute of Chartered Secretaries and Administrators
