= Waikato Mounted Rifles =

Territorial Force squadron of the Royal New Zealand Armoured Corps

- Active: 1869–present
- Country: New Zealand
- Allegiance: Elizabeth II
- Branch: New Zealand Army Reserve
- Type: Mounted Rifles
- Role: Mounted Reconnaissance
- Size: One Squadron
- Garrison/HQ: Rostrevor Street, Hamilton
- Mottos: Libertas et natale solum (Liberty and homeland)
- Colors: Maroon, Yellow and Black
- March: D'ye ken John Peel
- Anniversaries: 24 July – Regimental Birthday; 20 November – RNZAC Corps Day/Cambrai Day

The Waikato Mounted Rifles (WMR) is the New Zealand Army's only Army Reserve squadron of the Royal New Zealand Armoured Corps (RNZAC). The Squadron's origins can be traced back to 1869 when the first mounted unit was raised in the Waikato. Today the Squadron is part of 1st Battalion Royal New Zealand Infantry Regiment where it forms the regiment's reserve squadron. The WMR's role is mounted reconnaissance and surveillance.

== History ==
=== 1869–1914 ===
WMR's lineage extends back to the New Zealand Wars (1843–72) and the formation of the Cambridge Mounted Rangers Volunteers. This unit was accepted for service on 24 July 1869, and today this date is recognised as WMR's 'birthday' and commemorated by the Squadron each year. Although the Cambridge Mounted Rangers Volunteers were disbanded in 1870, they were effectively re-formed shortly afterwards as the Cambridge Cavalry Volunteers.

The formation of the Cambridge Cavalry Volunteers, together with the nearby Te Awamutu Cavalry Volunteers (1871) and the Hamilton Cavalry Volunteers (1880) led directly to the creation of the Waikato Mounted Rifle Volunteers (1897), and then to the 4th (Waikato) Mounted Rifles when New Zealand's Volunteer Force was superseded by the Territorial Force (TF) in 1911.

In 1885 all of New Zealand's Volunteer Force cavalry units were turned into mounted rifles units. This was more than just a change of title, as the New Zealand Volunteer Manual makes clear: "It cannot be too frequently impressed upon all ranks of mounted rifles that they are in no sense cavalry. They are only intended to fight on foot; their horses enabling them to make longer and more rapid movements than the infantry soldier."

Mounted riflemen had the same mobility as cavalry, but because they dismounted out of direct fire range, they were much less vulnerable. New Zealand's mounted troops still required, "all the élan, dash and spirit of cavalry, but train to fight dismounted".

The historian of the New Zealand Mounted Rifles in the First World War, Lieutenant Colonel (Retired) Terry Kinloch, however draws an important distinction between mounted rifles and mounted infantry. "A mounted rifleman was a horseman who was trained to fight on foot, but also to carry out some of the other cavalry functions, such as reconnaissance and screening. A mounted infantryman was no horseman. He rode a horse when he had to, but he fought on foot, and did not undertake reconnaissance or any other cavalry role. Mounted riflemen thus fitted in between cavalry and mounted infantry, performing some of the secondary roles of cavalry, but fighting on foot."

Another source explains that mounted infantry were foot soldiers provided with increased mobility, whilst mounted riflemen were horsemen trained to fight on foot in both offensive and defensive actions. As horsemen they were also expected to perform the duties of reconnoitring and screening troop movements as well as providing protection from surprise attacks. Mounted infantry were picked soldiers often organised in small units as adjuncts to an infantry brigade, or to an independent force of cavalry.

Each mounted rifles unit was recruited on a voluntary basis with troopers bringing their own horses to take part in military training. They were well represented when New Zealand first sent troops overseas to South Africa. On 28 September 1899, the New Zealand Government offered a contingent to serve with the British Imperial Forces in South Africa, two weeks before the war with the Boer republic began. A total of 10 contingents – the New Zealand Mounted Rifles (NZMR) – were sent between 1899 and 1902, totalling 6,495 officers and men and more than 8000 horses. (At this time New Zealand's population was only 900,000.)

The largest engagement in South Africa involving New Zealanders was at Langverwacht Hill in February 1902. Here, whilst defending a cordon enveloping between 800 and 900 Boer guerrillas under De Wet, the Seventh Contingent suffered badly: of approximately 90 men holding the New Zealand line, 24 were killed and more than 40 wounded. These losses are some of the most severe suffered by a New Zealand unit in a single short action in any war . Lord Kitchener reported that they had, "displayed great gallantry and resolution at a critical moment," and that their conduct on this occasion, "reflects the highest credit upon all ranks of the contingent, and upon the Colony to which it belongs. Nothing could have been finer than the behaviour of the men."

Earlier, General Sir Ian Hamilton, had said this of the New Zealanders he had observed in the field: "I have soldiered a long time now, but I have never in my life met men I would sooner soldier with than New Zealanders. I feel the greatest affection for them and I shall never forget the work they did in South Africa" Hamilton was to meet New Zealanders again in an even greater test fourteen years later at Gallipoli.

Another senior British officer, quoted in The Times History of the War in South Africa, wrote of the New Zealanders: "It would hardly be an exaggeration to say that after they had a little experience, they were, by general consent, regarded as on average the best mounted troops in South Africa." The battle honour 'South Africa 1900–02' was the first to be awarded to WMR.

When the TF was formed in 1911 (three years after the Territorial Army in Britain) and compulsory military training introduced, New Zealand could field 12 mounted rifles regiments. Today only two NZ Army units still carry the Mounted Rifles title: WMR and QAMR.

The cap badge of the 4th (Waikato) Mounted Rifles dates from shortly before the First World War: a native Kaka parrot within a wreath of kowhai leaves and blossoms. The Latin motto, "Libertas et Natale Solum" is best translated as "Liberty and Homeland".

The Regimental March, 'D'ye ken John Peel' was also adopted. This was published in 1903 for general use as a trot by all mounted units, and in England was then used by the East Riding of Yorkshire Yeomanry. While this regiment has since evolved into today's Yorkshire Squadron of The Queen's Own Yeomanry, the same Regimental March has been retained.

=== 1914–1918 ===
On the outbreak of the First World War in 1914, the 1st New Zealand Expeditionary Force (NZEF) was formed for overseas service. It included a NZMR brigade. The TF Auckland Mounted Rifles Brigade comprised three regiments. For the NZEF, each of those regiments contributed and sustained a service squadron to the Auckland Mounted Rifles Regiment (AMR) of the NZMR Brigade. The squadron provided to AMR by WMR was known as the 4th (Waikato) Squadron.

Terry Kinloch has described how the New Zealand mounted rifles regiments were organised: "Each mounted rifles regiment numbered 549 men and 608 horses organised as a headquarters, three squadrons and a machine gun section.

A squadron of 158 men and 169 horses comprised a headquarters and four troops. Each troop consisted of eight four-man sections. The section was the fundamental building block of the mounted rifles regiment. In combat, one man in each section was responsible for holding the horses when the other three fought on foot. The four men lived, worked, fought and sometimes died together, and they usually became close friends."

As part of the NZMR Brigade, the AMR served throughout the Gallipoli, Sinai and Palestine campaigns, finally returning to New Zealand in 1919 when it was demobilised. For this service the following battle honours were awarded to WMR: Anzac, Defence of Anzac, Hill 60 (Anzac), Sari Bair, Gallipoli 1915, Rumani, Magdaba-Rafah, Egypt 1915–17, Gaza-Beersheba, Jerusalem, Jaffa, Jericho, Jordan (Amman), Megiddo, Nablus and Palestine 1917–18.

The role played by the NZMR Brigade fighting dismounted alongside the infantry against the Turks during the Gallipoli campaign of 1915 has been well recorded; less well known are the Brigade's operations in Egypt, Palestine and Syria.

Arguably the finest hours of AMR's 4th Waikato Squadron on Gallipoli occurred during the 8 and 9 August 1915 during the assault on Chunuk Bair, the summit of the dominant Sari Bair Ridge. After a most hazardous approach under continuous fire, AMR succeeding in reaching the sorely pressed Wellington Infantry Battalion that had earlier seized the peak. Together the survivors held out against repeated Turkish assaults, suffering appalling casualties. When eventually relieved, AMR had virtually ceased to exist. Of the 288 that had advanced on the summit, only 22 were able to walk off the hill unaided. All the officers in the 4th Waikato Squadron were dead. Ultimately Chunuk Bair was lost, and Hamilton's August offensive failed.

The Gallipoli campaign decimated the original NZMR Brigade. When the peninsula finally came to be evacuated in December, almost half of the 4000 mounted riflemen who had served there since May had been killed or wounded.

Once reunited with their horses in Egypt, the Brigade formed part of what later became known as the Desert Mounted Corps, eventually consisting of 20,000 horsemen drawn from Australian, Indian, British Yeomanry and New Zealand units, and the largest tactical force of cavalry ever to operate under one command. The campaign under General Allenby concluded with the fall of Damascus and the complete defeat of the Turkish Army in 1918.

It is instructive to read extracts from the tributes paid afterwards to the NZMR Brigade by successive British Commanders in Chief: "New Zealand has every reason to be proud of what her sons have done for the Empire, and in no theatre have they more reason to be so than the glorious and bewilderingly successful campaign in Palestine." (General Sir John Maxwell, GCB, KCMG, CVO, DSO.) "Fortunate indeed is a commander in the field who has at his disposal New Zealand mounted troops, for he can depend on them at all times to display energy, resource and endurance. All these three qualities were time after time exemplified by the New Zealanders in the waterless desert country of Sinai... Not only is the brigade equal to any troops in energy, resource and endurance, but in addition it is second to none in determination and dash... The Empire is proud of the New Zealand Mounted Brigade and I personally owe it a debt of lasting gratitude." (General Sir Archibald Murray, CCMG, KCB, CVO, DSO.) "When the autumn campaign was in progress, the New Zealanders took a leading part in defeating the Turkish IV Army. In the Jordan Valley, and thence eastward, over their old battlefield of Shunet Nimrin, Es Salt and Amman, to the Hedjaz railway, the men of New Zealand fought and marched to final and complete victory. Nothing daunted these intrepid fighters; to them nothing was impossible." (Field Marshall Sir Edmund Allenby, GCB, GCMG).

Field Marshall Lord Wavell summarised the part played by the Desert Mounted Corps in the campaign like this: "The greatest exploit in history of horsed cavalry, and possibly their last success on a large scale, had ended within a short distance of the battlefield of Issus (333 B.C.), where Alexander the Great first showed how battles could be won by bold and well-handled horsemen."

The campaign in Egypt, Palestine and Syria was to be the heyday of New Zealand's mounted rifles regiments.

=== 1918–1939 ===
After the First World War the TF continued much in its previous form, although in 1921 the 12 mounted rifles regiments were reduced to nine. Horses were maintained in all the regiments. In the same year, the title of the 4th (Waikato) Mounted Rifles was altered first to the 4th New Zealand Mounted Rifles (Waikato), and then on 6 September 1927 to the Waikato Mounted Rifles.

In 1927 the New Zealand mounted rifles regiments received permission from King George V to carry Guidons. Although some mounted rifles regiments were later presented with Guidons, there is no record of WMR ever having received this honour, and that position continues to this day.

1927 was also the year in which two British cavalry regiments, the 11th Hussars (Prince Albert's Own) and the 12th Royal Lancers (Prince of Wales's), were converted to armoured cars, becoming the first regular cavalry in the world to be fully mechanised. The era of the horse in land warfare was slowly drawing to a close.

Meanwhile, the Waikato Mounted Rifles regiment was now based at the Drill Hall in Knox Street in Hamilton and organised into four squadrons: HQ, A, B, and C. A typical squadron consisted of about 160 soldiers with their horses, broken down into four troops.

Compulsory military training ceased in 1930 at the beginning of the Depression. At the same time pressure for mechanisation was growing and in 1936 it was decided that the TF would be motorised. As part of this process, each mounted rifles regiment was allowed to raise a light car and motorcycle troop. By 1937, with TF numbers dropping, the Government was forced to reduce the numbers of TF units in each military district. From now on, each district would have a composite mounted rifles regiment and a composite motorised mounted rifles squadron. In the Northern Military District, WMR provided one squadron for the horsed regiment, and one troop for the motorised squadron.

In 1939 the first armoured vehicles were purchased for the Army: six Bren gun carriers. Initially two were issued to each military district; later these were recalled to become the nucleus for the 2nd New Zealand Divisional Cavalry Regiment (more commonly known as the 'Div Cav').

=== 1939–1945 ===
After the outbreak of war with Germany, the TF was returned to its former size. There were some changes, mainly increasing the pre-war efforts to motorise the Army. One regiment in each mounted rifles brigade was now fully motorised, on the same basis as a British motorised battalion. In the Northern Military District this was to be WMR, and so as vehicles became available, the regiment was gradually parted from its horses.

At the start of the war, the Government agreed to raise an expeditionary force to be placed at the disposal of the British Government. The Div Cav was part of this force with the majority of its personnel coming from the mounted rifles regiments, including WMR who also provided the unit's first commanding officer, Lieutenant Colonel CJ Pierce, MC .

The Div Cav subsequently fought with General Freyberg's 2nd New Zealand Division in Greece, North Africa and Italy, equipped variously with Vickers Light Mark III and VIb tanks, Bren carriers, Marmon-Herrington armoured cars, M3 Stuart light tanks and Staghound armoured cars. The Div Cav had the double distinction of being the first unit to be raised and equipped with armour in New Zealand and the first New Zealand armoured unit to be deployed operationally overseas.

War correspondent and 2NZEF staff officer Geoffrey Cox described the men of the Div Cav he saw fighting in Crete like this: "They were mostly farmers, brown-faced, weather-beaten men, sinewy and fit, with at their head the huge figure of their commander, Major John Russell. Had the 2nd New Zealand Division run to an elite force the Divisional Cavalry would have been a candidate for that title."

The Div Cav provided many of the original volunteers for what was to become the Long Range Desert Group, amongst whom was at least one former WMR trooper.

Back in New Zealand in November 1941 it was decided that the mounted rifles regiments were to be reconstituted as armoured units and organised along the lines of a divisional cavalry unit, with armoured cars, Bren carriers and lorries. Much to the chagrin of those concerned, they were redesignated as 'Light Armoured Fighting Vehicle Regiments'. WMR thus became the 4th Light Armoured Fighting Vehicle (4 LAFV) regiment, based at Ngāruawāhia Camp near Hamilton. With the entry of the Japanese into the war in December 1941, the TF was mobilised for home defence.

The New Zealand Armoured Corps was formed on 1 January 1942 (the ‘Royal’ prefix was not granted until 12 July 1947). The first Stuart tanks, 24 in all, arrived in New Zealand in June 1942. The following month personnel from each LAFV regiment were sent to the New Zealand Armoured Fighting Vehicle School at Waiouru Military Camp to take part in training on the new tanks, more of which arrived in October.

In November further developments took place with each unit being designated as either an armoured regiment with a mix of Stuart and valentine tanks, or a reconnaissance regiment with Stuart tanks, Beaverette armoured cars and carriers. In the process, and much to their satisfaction, the units regained their old titles. It took until 1943 to implement these changes.

From April 1943 onwards the mounted rifles regiments were called upon to provide personnel for the reinforcement drafts for units overseas, mainly being the 18th, 19th and 20th Armoured Regiments that were equipped with M4 Sherman tanks in the 4th New Zealand Armoured Brigade in Italy. This service was recognised at the end of the war when the Auckland, Waikato and North Auckland Mounted Rifles Regiments inherited the battle honours of the 18th Armoured Regiment from the Italian campaign: The Sangro, Castel Frentano, Orsogna, Advance to Florence, San Michele, Paula Line, Celle, Pisciatello, the Senio, Santerno Crossing, Bologna, Idice Bridgehead and Italy 1943–45.

By June the drain on personnel had been so severe that no TF unit was fully operational, and in July all the mounted rifles regiments were reduced to training cadres for training personnel for overseas service. Finally, in March 1944 came the reorganisation of the New Zealand Armoured Corps. Three armoured regiments were to be formed, one in each military district. In the Northern Military District the three mounted rifles regiments, including WMR, were amalgamated to form the 1st Armoured Regiment.

=== 1945–1999 ===
Following the Second World War, the TF remained largely dormant until 1949 when compulsory military training was reintroduced in New Zealand for the armed forces. In 1951 the Waikato Regiment, a pre-war infantry unit, was incorporated into the 1st Armoured Regiment to form the 1st Armoured Regiment (Waikato), RNZAC. The Colours of the Waikato Regiment were handed to the 1st Armoured Regiment (Waikato) and accepted by it at a ceremonial Colours Parade held in Seddon Park, Hamilton on Anzac Day 1956. These Colours were later laid up in St Andrew's Church, Cambridge in October 1970.

Over the next 50 years, as compulsory military training has come and gone, with successive reorganisations taking place, regimental titles in the RNZAC have frequently changed. In 1959 the 1st Armoured Regiment (Waikato), RNZAC became the Waikato Regiment, RNZAC; the 2nd Armoured Regiment became Queen Alexandra's Regiment RNZAC; and the 4th Armoured Regiment became the Wellington East Coast Regiment, RNZAC. A year later the Waikato, Queen Alexandra's and Wellington East Coast Regiments were reduced to squadrons, together forming a new 1st Armoured Regiment, RNZAC.

In 1963–64 the 1st Armoured Regiment split, with Queen Alexandra's and Wellington East Coast Squadrons becoming the 1st Armoured Squadron (Queen Alexandra's), and the Waikato Squadron becoming the 2nd Armoured Squadron (Waikato). In 1970 the 1st and 2nd Armoured Squadrons amalgamated to form Queen Alexandra's (Waikato/Wellington East Coast) Squadron, but in 1983 this divided again to form Queen Alexandra's Squadron and the Waikato/Wellington East Coast (Wai/WEC) Squadron.

In 1990 all New Zealand's armoured units were brought together for the first time in the 1st Armoured Group. Three years later this was re-titled Queen Alexandra's Mounted Rifles (QAMR). The Wai/WEC Squadron formed C Squadron.

Six years of relative stability followed before further changes occurred. In 1999 a wide-ranging review and reorganisation of the TF took place that resulted in the transfer of the Wai/WEC Squadron to the 6th Battalion (Hauraki), Royal New Zealand Infantry Regiment (RNZIR) – a Territorial infantry unit based in Tauranga in the Bay of Plenty.

=== 1999–2024 ===
Within the Haurakis, C and D Companies were absorbed into Wai/WEC Squadron, together being known as the Waikato Squadron, although no official title change took place. The Squadron's recruiting boundaries were reduced to conform to those of the Haurakis, which excluded the Wellington/East Coast region. The years that followed proved a particular challenge to the Squadron, as it fought to retain its existence, separate identity and mounted reconnaissance role.

At the TF Seminar in August 2002, the Chief of Army, Major General Mateparae, directed that – in the interests of fostering unit pride, respecting tradition, raising morale, strengthening links with local communities and assisting recruitment – Territorial units (and where appropriate sub-units) would revert to their previous titles. To accommodate these changes, Territorial infantry regiments would form battalion groups; thus the Haurakis would become the 6th (Hauraki) Battalion Group in which Wai/WEC Squadron would be a sub-unit.

The re-adoption of historical titles did not alter battalion group boundaries, so with the loss of the Wellington East Coast region it was inappropriate to maintain the WEC part of the Squadron's title. This provided the opportunity for the Squadron to return to its historical roots and revive the title of the Waikato Mounted Rifles. In early 2003, and strongly supported by the Waikato Mounted Rifles Regimental Association, a formal submission was made to alter the Squadron's title. This was approved by the Chief of Army in September of the same year.

A further submission was to follow. This was for the restoration of the WMR hat and collar badges. After a protracted campaign, this was eventually agreed in April 2006. Based exactly on the pre-1914 originals, it was not however until May 2008 that the new badges were finally presented to Squadron personnel by the then Colonel Commandant RNZAC, Brigadier IH Duthie, CNZM. In 2003, WMR's role was defined as: "...to provide general purpose medium reconnaissance, surveillance and target acquisition in order to support New Zealand Light Armoured Vehicle mounted battalion operations. It is to provide trained personnel to top up and round out Queen Alexandra’s Squadron..."

Partly as a result of diminishing resources, and partly due to the low priority accorded the TF within the Army, WMR had by then moved from reconnaissance training on FV101 Scorpion CVR(T) and M113 APCs to modified V8 Land Rovers. By the start of the 21st century some of the latter vehicles were actually older than their crews.

In 2004 the Government purchased from Automotive Technik (UK) 321 armoured and non-armoured Pinzgauer Light Operational Vehicles (LOV) to replace the Army's ageing Land Rover fleet. It was only in 2007 that the decision was made that WMR would be equipped with the 6 x 6 armoured (and lightly armed) version of LOV, and the following year WMR received sufficient vehicles for one troop. While these vehicles do not fit the Squadron's designated role, they have provided a training platform necessary to continue as a reserve reconnaissance squadron.

As part of a revised policy of integrating non-infantry TF units into the RF (or re-integrating in the case of WMR), in July 2012 the Squadron left the Haurakis and returned to QAMR as the regiment's reserve squadron. WMR's role was now defined as being to provide a reserve cavalry capability to the NZ Army, focusing on a mounted reconnaissance and surveillance skill set. With the re-integration of WMR into QAMR, a formal proposal for the presentation of a Guidon to the Squadron was withdrawn.

=== 2025-2026 ===
On the 5th of December 2025, the Queen Alexandra's Mounted Rifles (QAMR) were formally amalgamated into the 1st Battalion Royal New Zealand Infantry Regiment. 1 RNZIR would now become a motorized infantry battalion.

"The new unit will retain the name 1 RNZIR and will be organised as a Motorised Infantry Battalion, with one of its sub-units retaining the QAMR name."

As of January 16, 2006, Brigadier General GA Motley, Chief of Staff, HQNZDF, replied (in response to a FYI New Zealand information request): "The Royal New Zealand Armoured Corps remains active. The Waikato Mounted Rifles remains a reserve sub-unit reporting under the 1st Battalion Royal New Zealand Infantry Regiment; the sub-unit does not currently appear on the NZ Army Organisational Map as it is in the process of being updated."

== Current organisation ==
Based in Hamilton (pop.141,000) in the Waikato, upper North Island, WMR is nominally equipped with the armoured version of the Pinzgauer LOV, armed with either a single 7.62mm FN MAG 58 MG or a 7.62mm FN Minimi MG.

The Squadron is presently configured for approximately 50 personnel in two light reconnaissance troops mounted in unarmoured LOVs, together with a skeleton Squadron headquarters, an administrative section and a forward repair team. In future it is hoped that a small composite troop with LAV crewmen and a dismounted scout section may be added.

If deployed, the Squadron's strength would in theory be eventually raised to 102 personnel, with the additional manpower creating a full NZLAV troop and rounding out the two LOV troops and Squadron headquarters.

== Alliances ==
An alliance between the 4th (Waikato) Mounted Rifles and the British 4/7th Royal Dragoons (today the Royal Dragoon Guards) was formed in 1926. This alliance was inherited by QAMR when Wai/WEC Squadron was transferred to the 6th Battalion (Hauraki) RNZIR in 1999.

An alliance between the RNZAC and the British Royal Tank Regiment (RTR) was formed in 1966. In January 1967, in recognition of this alliance, Her Majesty The Queen (as Captain-General of the RNZAC and Colonel-in-Chief of the RTR) gave her approval for members of the RNZAC to wear the RTR's tank arm badge.

== Regimental Association ==
Following the successful bid to restore the WMR title to the Squadron, members of the WMR Regimental Association (founded in 1946) amended their Rules in 2004 to admit and welcome past and serving personnel of the Squadron as members of the Association. Some Squadron personnel were also invited to join the Association's committee. Today there are about 140 members, of whom roughly one third are currently serving in WMR.

== Regimental history: Waikato Troopers ==
In 2007 the first complete history of WMR, Waikato Troopers, was written and published by Richard Stowers, a military historian and author living in Hamilton. The foreword to Waikato Troopers was written by Lieutenant General Mateparae (then Chief of the Defence Force and now Governor-General of New Zealand). In it he wrote: "New Zealand has a tradition of military service that, in large part, rests on the service of citizen soldiers in both peace and war. The men of the Waikato Mounted Rifles represent that tradition admirably."

== In memoriam ==
The Government declared 2006 to be the 'Year of the Veteran' and established a Community Grants Fund. The WMR Regimental Association successfully applied for funding to enable a number of memorial plaques to be commissioned, dedicated to the memory of former comrades who lost their lives in conflicts overseas. Rather than a single memorial, the Association preferred the idea of placing these plaques in churches and public grounds in settlements and towns in the heart of the Waikato, where WMR still recruits and trains today.

Between 2007 and 2010 eight plaques were dedicated and unveiled in Waerenga, Te Kauwhata, Te Awamutu (2), Hamilton (2) and Cambridge (2). Beneath the WMR title and badge, the inscription on each plaque reads: "In memory of those from this district [or town/city, as appropriate] who lost their lives on active service and in honour of all those who served."

Mounted riflemen from the Waikato have served in all the overseas conflicts in which New Zealanders have fought. Casualty figures are incomplete, but recent research has revealed that eight died in South Africa; 74 at Gallipoli; and 42 in Sinai and Palestine. One hundred and fifty-eight were wounded on Gallipoli and in the Middle East.

It is impossible to discover the exact losses of former WMR servicemen during the Second World War, for unlike the First World War, WMR did not send and sustain a formed service squadron overseas for the duration. Aside from the Div Cav, to which all nine mounted rifles regiments then in existence contributed, WMR's soldiers were drafted as reinforcements, mainly to the 4th New Zealand Armoured Brigade, but also to the infantry and some even to the Navy and Air Force. It is known that 29 former WMR soldiers were killed in action with the Div Cav. A further 14 died in other units, but sadly the list is incomplete.

While it is not known whether any former WMR soldiers died in either the Korean or Vietnam wars, the only New Zealander to be killed in action in East Timor (in 2000) came from the Waikato and had previously served in the Squadron for several years before transferring to the Royal New Zealand Infantry Regiment. Since 2000, some 37 members of WMR have served on operational deployments overseas in East Timor, the Solomon Islands, South Korea and Afghanistan, but so far without incurring any further losses.

== War horse statue ==
In November 2017 several members of WMR participated in a parade during the presentation of a statue dedicated to the horses sent to war with the New Zealand Army.
