= HDMS Galathea =

At least three ships of the Royal Danish Navy have borne the name HDMS Galathea:

- HDMS Galathea (1831) a corvette launched in 1831 and decommissioned in 1861
- HDMS Galathea (1916) an Ægir-class submarine launched in 1916 and sold for scrap in 1946
- HDMS Galathea (1949) a survey ship launched as HMS Leith. Acquired by the Danish Navy from mercantile service and renamed in 1949; she was sold for scrap in 1955
