= Galatea =

Galatea is an ancient Greek name meaning "she who is milk-white".

Galatea, Galathea or Gallathea may refer to:

== In mythology ==
- Galatea (mythology), several ancient Greek mythological figures

== In the arts ==
- Galatea (Raphael), or The Triumph of Galatea, a 1512 fresco of Ovid's sea nymph
- Gallathea, a late sixteenth-century play by John Lyly
- Galatea, or Pygmalion Reversed, an 1883 musical comedy by Henry Pottinger Stephens, W. Webster and Meyer Lutz
- Galatea, a 2009 play by Lawrence Aronovitch
- La Galatea, a sixteenth-century pastoral novel by Miguel de Cervantes
- Galatea (novel), a 1953 novel by James M. Cain
- Galatea, a 1976 novel by Philip Pullman
- Galatea 2.2, a 1995 novel by Richard Powers
- Galatea, a 1977 ballet film with Ekaterina Maximova and Māris Liepa
- Galatea (video game), released in 2000
- Galatea, a main figure in the Pygmalion and the Image series of four paintings by Sir Edward Coley Burne-Jones (1878)
- Galatea, a 2013 short story by Madeline Miller

== Fictional characters ==
- Galatea, a major character in Pamphilus de amore, a poem from 1200
- Galatea, in the manga Claymore by Norihiro Yagi
- Galatea, a villain in the 1990s Japanese anime series Bubblegum Crisis: Tokyo 2040
- Galatea, a supervillain appearing in Justice League Unlimited
- Galatea, a female robot in the film Bicentennial Man
- Galatea, in the mobile game Fate/Grand Order
- Galatea Dunkel, in the 1957 novel On the Road by Jack Kerouac
- Galatea, an android in the 2007 novel Soon I Will Be Invincible by Austin Grossman

== Flora and fauna ==
- Galatea (bivalve), a genus of bivalve molluscs in the family Donacidae
- Galathea, a genus of squat lobsters
- Galatea, common name for plants of the genus Dieffenbachia
- Galatea, a taxonomic synonym for the plant genus Galatella

== Places ==
- Galatea, New Zealand, a village on the North Island
- Galatea, Ohio, a community in the United States
- Mount Galatea, in the Canadian Rockies
- Galathea National Park, Great Nicobar Island, India
- Galathea River, Great Nicobar Island
- Emden Deep, also known as the Galathea Deep or Galathea Depth, a portion of the Philippine Trench in the Pacific Ocean
- Galatea (moon), a moon of Neptune
- 74 Galatea, a large main belt asteroid

== Other uses ==
- List of ships named Galatea or Galathea
- Galatea (locomotive), a preserved example of the LMS Jubilee class of steam locomotive
- Galatea II a Thoroughbred racehorse
- Galatea, a type of cotton twill fabric

== See also ==
- Galatea of the Spheres, a 1952 painting by Salvador Dalí
- Galathée (disambiguation)
- Galatia (disambiguation)
- Galateo (disambiguation)
