= 24th Battalion (New Zealand) =

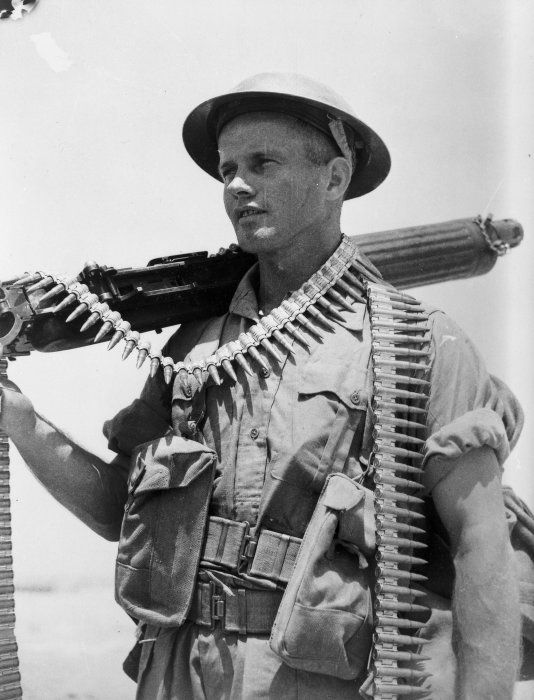
- 24th Battalion soldier Jim Dempsey with a Vickers machine gun at Helwan
- Active: 1940–45
- Country: New Zealand
- Branch: New Zealand Military Forces
- Type: Infantry
- Size: ~800 personnel
- Part of: 6th Infantry Brigade
- Engagements: Second World War: Battle of Greece; North African Campaign; Italian Campaign

The 24th Auckland Battalion was an infantry battalion of the New Zealand Army during the Second World War. The 24th Battalion was formed on 1 February 1940 and embarked for Egypt on 28 October 1940. It was part of the 6th Infantry Brigade, part of the 2nd New Zealand Division. The battalion fought in Greece, North Africa and Italy. After the conclusion of hostilities, the battalion was disbanded in December 1945.

== Formation ==
Following the outbreak of the Second World War, the New Zealand government authorised the formation of the 2nd New Zealand Expeditionary Force (2NZEF), for service at home and abroad. Following consultation with the British government, it was decided that the main New Zealand contribution to the war effort would be in the form of an infantry division, the 2nd New Zealand Division, which would require nine battalions of infantry. Consequently, several infantry battalions were formed from 1939 to 1940 with New Zealand volunteers and these would eventually be sent to the Middle East, the expected deployment area of the 2nd New Zealand Division.

The 24th Battalion was formed on 1 February 1940 at Narrow Neck Military Camp with personnel drawn largely from the Auckland region. It was the first of three infantry battalions that formed part what was initially known as the Third Echelon of the 2NZEF and which would later be designated the 6th Infantry Brigade of the 2nd New Zealand Division. Under the command of Lieutenant Colonel Clayden Shuttleworth, of the New Zealand Staff Corps, a cadre of 150 officers and non-commissioned officers underwent training aimed to prepare them for the task of preparing the volunteers that would make up the bulk of the battalion's personnel. After an initial period at Narrow Neck, the men moved to Papakura Military Camp where the main draft of the battalion arrived on 15 May 1940 for training.

With an establishment of around 780 men, the battalion was organised into four rifle companies, designated A through to D, a headquarters company consisting of specialised personnel such as signals and a battalion headquarters. The rifle companies were organised along provincial lines; men from the Auckland region were generally placed in A Company, while those from the Hauraki, North Auckland and Waikato were assigned to B, C, and D Companies respectively.

The battalion embarked for active service on 28 August 1940, boarding the Empress of Japan. It arrived in the Middle East on 29 September and entrained for the 2NZEF base at Maadi, in Egypt. It drilled and practiced field tactics for the next several months, escalating to brigade level exercises by the end of the year.

== Greece ==
The British Government anticipated an invasion of Greece by the Germans in 1941 and decided to send troops to support the Greeks. The 2nd New Zealand Division was one of a number of Allied units dispatched to Greece in early March. The battalion departed Egypt over the period 13 to 15 March and, on arriving in Greece, began to move north. The 6th Infantry Brigade was tasked with the defence of the coastal portion of the Aliakmon Line in northern Greece, with the 24th Battalion preparing and manning the defences around the village of Skala Elevtherokhorion. In Katerini, while en route to its allocated position, the battalion suffered its first casualty, when an enlisted man was accidentally shot. He was buried in the local cemetery.

On 26 March, the battalion reached their positions on 26 March 1941 and began fortifying them. Shuttleworth positioned his headquarters in the village of Palaio Eleftherochori, close to the railway line on the Greek eastern coast near the Gulf of Salonika. The rifle companies were positioned next to the railway and the main north road. Their right was on the coast and their left four miles inland, at the positions of the 25th Battalion. To the 25th's left was 4th Brigade. On 27 March, the 19th and 26th Battalions, each missing one company, were sent back to Olympus Pass to dig positions for 5th Brigade. The division's front was 28,000 yards, held by the seven battalions of 4th and 6th Brigades less three detached companies. The battalion's positions were on high ground, with the left of the sector wooded. However, the right sector was in open country and usable by armoured vehicles, so an anti-tank ditch was placed on the line of the Toponitsa stream, where the 6th Brigade lines were. They were supported by the artillery of the 4th and 5th Field Regiments. To the north of this was the Aliakmon River, whose bridges were mined by the 1st British Armoured Brigade.

By the beginning of April, the 26th Battalion was replaced by the 23rd Battalion at Olympus Pass and was positioned between the 24th and 25th. The New Zealand Divisional Cavalry Regiment was on the Aliakmon River. After the German invasion of Greece on 6 April, the 24th Battalion occupied its battle positions and the bridge over the anti tank ditch north of the village of Skala Eleftherochoriou was destroyed. The Divisional Cavalry also blew up the Aliakmon crossings later the same nigh. Refugees from the north blocked roads and panicked the local villages, who attempted to flee, but were stopped by the intervention of Shuttleworth. On 10 April, 24 Battalion, leaving two rifle platoons and the Carrier Platoon as rearguard, retreated to Ganochora, three miles north of Katerini. 6th Brigade was now in the rear of 5th Brigade. The battalion bivouacked at the village of Agios Dimitrios and marched westward to Livadhion. The battalion was then ordered to a position near Skoteina, which was between the 28th (Maori) Battalion and the 16th Australian Brigade. After reaching Skoteina, the 24th Battalion was suddenly recalled to Livadhion to cover the retreat of the ANZAC Corps.

The 24th Battalion defended a position near Elasson. The road out of Elasson forked into two branches and ran for three miles across a level plain. The eastern branch then climbed abruptly over a steep ridge. The western branch made a wider loop to Tyrnavos that was suitable for armoured vehicles. As a result of this, B Company was detached under command of the 25th Battalion for its defence. The other companies made positions on the east road with C Company on the right, D Company on the centre and A Company on the left on a ridge overlooking the plain of Elasson. The ridge was rocky, which meant that trenches could not be dug and the troops could only build rock walls. Three sections of the Carrier Platoon were detached on 17 April to Tyrnavos to protect a troop of 25 pdr guns. On 18 April, German tanks attacked. The remaining Bren Gun Carriers were on the plain, but were withdrawn to the rear under fire from both Australian and German batteries. After the carriers were in the rear, the east road was blown. However, the explosives had practically no effect on the road, but there was no time to bring up more explosives, so the road was left in that state. At dusk, 40 German tanks and 20 troop carrying lorries came out of Elasson and advanced along the east road. They were shelled by Australian artillery, dispersing the lorries. The tanks stopped at the road crater as the battalion withdrew down the road at night to Nea Anchialos on the Gulf of Volos. The third platoon of D Company engaged the tanks without much success with a Boys anti-tank rifle in the dark. Facing German air attacks, the battalion foot marched and then motor marched to a position slightly south of Molos.

On 21 April, trucks carried the battalion to its position in the coastal sector of the Thermopylae Line. After the surrender of the Greek forces in Epirus, plans were changed. Now, the 6th Brigade was to hold the line for two days until the night of 24 April, then retreat and embark at Chalcis. On 24 April, German motorcyclists, followed by tanks and motorized infantry, attacked down the Lamia road. The tanks were destroyed by the Australian artillery, but the German infantry attempted to turn 25 Battalion's flank, which was refused. However, pressure upon the 25th's left forced them to give ground. As a result, 24 Battalion was realigned in the afternoon and the troops commenced destroying equipment that could not be removed. The infantry companies retreated as scheduled towards the Peloponnese beaches, as plans had been changed because of the German advance. The 24th Battalion took positions around Tripolis in response to German paratroop drops on the Isthmus of Corinth. Two platoons and portions of two others from A and B Companies went to Kalamata instead, where they were captured. The 24th Battalion retreated to Monemvasia, where they embarked in the predawn darkness of 29 April on HMS Ajax and the destroyers HMS Hotspur and HMS Havock. At dawn the ships reached Suda Bay, where the destroyers transferred the soldiers on board to the transport Comliebank. Ajax reached Alexandria on 30 April, where most of the battalion on board was driven to Amiriya Camp. Meanwhile, the transport did not arrive at Port Said until 2 May. Both groups rejoined each other at Helwan on 6 May. During the Greek campaign, 24th Battalion had suffered casualties of 138 captured, 6 killed and 6 wounded.

== North Africa ==
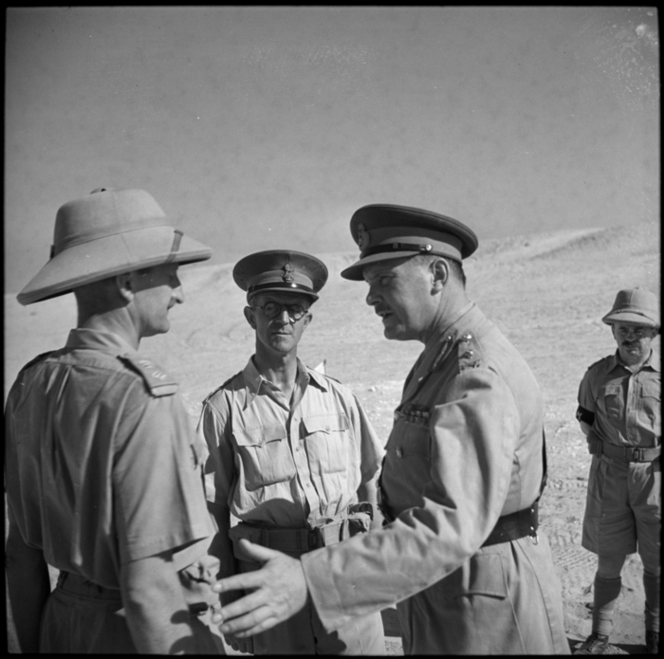
Major General Bernard Freyberg (centre right), arriving to conduct a review of 6th Brigade, is greeted by the commander of 24th Battalion, Lieutenant Colonel Clayden Shuttleworth (left), and Brigadier Harold Barrowclough, September 1941

After a period of refitting, disrupted by a move to near the Suez Canal to defend a possible attack, the battalion shifted to the Baggush Box in September 1941. Here the battalion underwent training in desert warfare in preparation for its role in the upcoming Operation Crusader, planned to lift the siege of Tobruk. The 2nd New Zealand Division was one of the infantry divisions of the Eighth Army that was to surround and capture the main strong points along the front while the armoured divisions was to seek out and engage Field Marshal Erwin Rommel's Afrika Korps. At the same time, the Tobruk garrison was to attempt a breakout. In November, the 6th Brigade moved to its starting positions in Libya to be held in reserve while the initial part of the offensive commenced.

=== Sidi Rezegh ===
The brigade entered the fray on 21 November, with 24th Battalion leading the advance of the brigade to Bir el Hariga, while 4th Brigade targeted the Bardia-Tobruk highway and 5th Brigade the area around Bardia and Sollum. However, the following day, the 6th Brigade was ordered to advance to Point 175, set up a perimeter and then make contact with the 5th South African Brigade at Sidi Rezegh, which was in some difficulty. Leaving early in the morning of 23 November, Shuttleworth led his battalion along the correct route and reached the appropriate waypoint by dawn. However, the two other battalions of the brigade had bivouacked in the wrong area, in a wadi rather than along the ridge on which 24th Battalion had been advancing. Taking his battalion into the wadi from one end, Shuttleworth realised that elements of the Afrika Korps were moving into the wadi from the other end. This initiated a battle in which the battalion, having appreciated the situation more quickly than the Germans, took 200 prisoners.

Sixth Brigade moved on quickly to make Point 175, which was held by German forces, as soon as possible. Point 175 marked the start of the Sidi Rezegh escarpment, 40 kilometres from Tobruk. Arriving a few hours after their initial contact with the enemy earlier in the morning, a first attempt to capture Point 175 was made by 25th Battalion while 26th Battalion sought to make contact with the South Africans. The 24th Battalion was held in reserve but Shuttleworth and two companies of the battalion were soon called upon to reinforce the attack being carried out by the 25th Battalion. The remaining two companies moved forward that evening to help secure the little ground that had been won. Despite, the battalion's B Company capturing the summit of Point 175 the following day, it was not until 27 November that all of Sidi Rezegh was under the control of the New Zealanders. However, Rommel had inflicted a significant defeat on the British armour and was now returning to the Tobruk area.

The 6th Brigade was strung out along Sidi Rezegh in pockets, vulnerable to a counter-attack, and elements of the 15th Panzer Division began attacking on 28 November. An erroneous message to 24th Battalion, now stationed on high ground near the Sidi Rezegh mosque, led its personnel to expect South African troops to pass through their lines; advancing troops were allowed to approach unmolested until it was realised they were Germans. By then most of two companies of the battalion were effectively under gunpoint and were forced to surrender. A squadron of Valentine tanks was sent to the area, along with the battalion's carriers, to reinforce what was left of the battalion and drove off the attacking Germans for the time being. In the evening, 24th Battalion was joined by the 26th Battalion, which came under Shuttleworth's command following the loss of its own commanding officer. The next day was uneventful, apart from occasional artillery, but elsewhere Point 175 was captured by the Germans and the 4th Infantry Brigade, positioned to the north, was coming under attack.

By 30 November, 6th Brigade was surrounded, and 24th Battalion's strength had been whittled down to 163 men. The 15th Panzer Division began attacking after midday with tanks and infantry. Despite the support of anti-tank guns, both 24th and 26th Battalions were overrun and Shuttleworth was made a prisoner-of war along with his surviving company commanders. (Note: Shuttleworth was later recognised for his services in the Middle East with the Distinguished Service Order. He died on 15 May 1945, shortly after being released from a prisoner-of-camp and was buried at Brookwood Military Cemetery in Surrey, England.) Nearly 300 members of the battalion were captured and another 100 were killed or died of wounds. Some 60-odd personnel managed to evade capture and made their way to 6th Brigade headquarters while 20 others made their way into Tobruk.

=== Syria ===
The battalion was reformed at Baggush from those who had escaped capture at Sidi Rezegh and other personnel that had been left out of battle, along with replacements from New Zealand. Lieutenant Colonel Greville, who had been Deputy Assistant Quarter Master General of the 2NZEF, was appointed its commander. It moved to Maadi Camp in January 1942 and shortly afterwards was called into Cairo for four days to increase the Allied presence there and counter potential unrest amongst the civilian population of the city. From late February to mid-March, the 2nd New Zealand Division was transferred to Syria. It was feared that the Middle East was at risk from an invasion by the Germans and the New Zealanders were to block the likely route from the Caucasus.

Stationed at Afrine, close to the border with Turkey, to the northwest of Aleppo, 24th Battalion covered railway lines in the area as well as conducting training. In mid-April, the battalion moved to the Djedeide Fortress, near Lebanon, along with the rest of 6th Brigade. The companies rotated between training, guard duties, and labouring on a track in the area. From late-May to early-June the battalion was involved in divisional exercises between it returned to Afrine. Then, following the attack on the Eighth Army's Gazala Line by Panzer Army Africa, the 2nd New Zealand Division was recalled to Egypt. The battalion departed Afrine on 19 June, headed for Amiriya in Egypt where it arrived five days later.

=== Egypt ===
The 2nd New Zealand Division was dispatched to the lines of El Alamein and while 4th and 5th Brigades went south to Minqar Qaim, the 6th Brigade was held initially held in reserve before being dispatched to man the fortress at Bab el Qattara. Arriving on 28 June, the 24th Battalion guarded the northern side of the fortress, while 25th and 26th Battalions were responsible for the west and south sides respectively. The brigade remained here, watching first the retreating British stream by and then the Germans, at a distance, for several days before moving back to Amiriya. It missed the action of 14–15 July at Ruweisat Ridge which saw the destruction of a large part of 4th and 5th Brigades when, after securing the ridge, no armour was available to defend a counterattack by the Germans. The 6th Brigade was recalled to the El Alamein lines to relieve what was left of 4th Brigade. A few days later, it was involved in a night-time attack on the El Mrier Depression. The aim was to secure the depression to create a route through which British armour could penetrate. The brigade successfully achieved its objective and was consolidating its positions when the 21st Panzer Division attacked on 22 July.

At daylight, German tanks caught the battalion, positioned in the relatively shallow El Mrier Depression, by surprise. Firing from the edge of a low cliff overlooking the depression, the Germans caused heavy losses before moving through the battalion's position in pursuit of the British armour. The battalion's commanding officer, Lieutenant Colonel Greville was killed, one of 280 casualties from the 440 personnel that were involved in the attack. The survivors, aggrieved at the lack of armoured support, were evacuated back to Maadi. The rest of 6th Brigade moved to the southern section of the Alamein line where manned defensive positions during the Battle of Alam Halfa, Rommel's failed attempt to cut off the 8th Army.

The 8th Army was now under the command of General Bernard Montgomery, who was planning for offensive operations against the Afrika Corps, which had formed a defensive position at Alamein. The 2nd New Zealand Division was to play a major role in the forthcoming attack, which began its first of three phases on 23 October. The New Zealanders advanced behind a creeping artillery barrage which commenced at 9:40 pm and quickly attained all its objectives and began consolidating them. The division was withdrawn four days later. They remained out of the battle while the Australian 9th Division took up the offensive in the northern section of the front. Along with two British infantry brigades, the 2nd New Zealand Division resumed the fight on 2 November in Operation Supercharge, which was intended to break the frontlines in the south. The German defences collapsed and on 4 November they began retreating with the New Zealanders chasing them. In mid-November, the division was withdrawn to Bardia.

It re-entered the campaign in mid-December at El Agheila in an attempt to trap the Afrika Corps, and unsuccessfully attempted again at Nofilia a few days later. The advanced continued and on 23 January 1943, entered Tripoli. The Afrika Corps had withdrawn to the Mareth Line in Tunisia.

== Italy ==
With the close of the North African campaign in May 1943, attention then turned to the European theatre of operations. Despite a preference amongst some sections of the New Zealand government for the 2nd New Zealand Division to be redeployed in the Pacific theatre, it was decided that the division, having served with the Eighth Army throughout the desert campaign would remain in Europe. The battalion left Egypt on 6 October and reached Taranto three days later.

The 2nd New Zealand Division moved to the banks of the Sangro River later in the month and 6th Brigade was scheduled to mount a night crossing on 21 November. Two companies of 24th Battalion had crossed the previous night to reconnoitre the opposite bank but the attack was postponed due to the weather. The brigade eventually crossed, with 24th Battalion on its left front, on 27 November. In the following weeks, the battalion was involved 6th Brigade's attack on Orsogna, as part of the Moro River Campaign. Although the infantry made some gains, the German defences were too strong and the attack soon faded into a stalemate, with a number of back and forth actions as winter set in. Offensive operations around Orsogna ceased in late December and the New Zealanders withdrew from the area altogether on 13 January 1944.

Following its withdrawal from the area around Orsogna, the 2nd New Zealand Division was one of a number of divisions that was transferred from the Eighth Army to the Fifth Army, then engaged on the western side of the Apennines. This was part of an overall strategy to breach the Gustav Line and break an otherwise deadlocked Italian front. Together with the 4th Indian Division and supporting British and American artillery, the division was part of the newly formed New Zealand Corps, under the command of the New Zealand divisional commander, Major General Bernard Freyberg. The corps moved to Cassino, the defenders of which had resisted American forces for several weeks.

An initial attack involving the 4th Indian Division, the 28th Maori Battalion and New Zealand engineers, was mounted in February but failed due to a lack of air and armoured support. After a three-week delay, 6th Brigade mounted an attack on the town of Cassino itself, which had been thoroughly shelled and bombed during the intervening period. Supported by 19th Armoured Regiment, 24th, 25th and 26th Battalions pushed into Cassino. The Germans defended strongly, assisted by the rubble that affected the easy movement of the armour.

== Disbandment ==
The battalion, along with other elements of the 2nd New Zealand Division, remained in and around Trieste for several weeks to counter the presence of the partisans, who had laid claim to the city. It was not until mid-June that the partisans withdrew from the city and it would be several more weeks before the New Zealand government decided that the division would not be required for service in the Pacific theatre of operations. Lieutenant Colonel Boord took over command of the battalion in July and early the following month it withdrew to wintering positions near Florence. Here the battalion began demobilising and was effectively disbanded by late December 1945.

During the war, the 24th Battalion lost 440 officers and men either killed in action or who later died of their wounds. Just over 600 personnel were made prisoners of war.

The 24th Battalion Association was formed in 1947 for the veterans of the unit to maintain links with their fellow soldiers. It lasted until 21 April 2012, when an official military ceremony was held to mark the disbanding of the association. By this time, it had only 28 members.

== Commanding officers ==
The following officers commanded the 24th Battalion:

- Lt. Col. C. Shuttleworth (1 February 1940 – 30 November 1941)
- Major S. J. Hedge (30 November 1941 – 8 December 1941)
- Lt. Col. A. W. Greville (8 December 1941 – 22 July 1942)
- Major R. G. Webb (22 July 1942 – 26 July 1942)
- Lt. Col. F. J. Gwilliam (26 July 1942 – 22 November 1942)
- Lt. Col. R. G. Webb (22 November 1942 – 16 December 1942)
- Lt. Col. J. Conolly (16 December 1942 – 5 February 1944)
- Major P. R. Pike (5 February 1944 – 20 March 1944)
- Lt. Col. J. Conolly (20 March 1944 – 22 April 1944)
- Lt. Col. P. R. Pike (22 April – 4 June 1944)
- Major E. W. Aked (4 June 1944 – 8 June 1944)
- Lt. Col. R. L. Hutchens (8 June 1944 – 12 May 1945)
- Lt. Col. K. H. MacDonald (12 May 1945 – 5 July 1945)
- Lt. Col. R. Boord (5 July 1945 – disbandment)

== Notes ==
Footnotes

Citations
