= Hauraki Regiment =

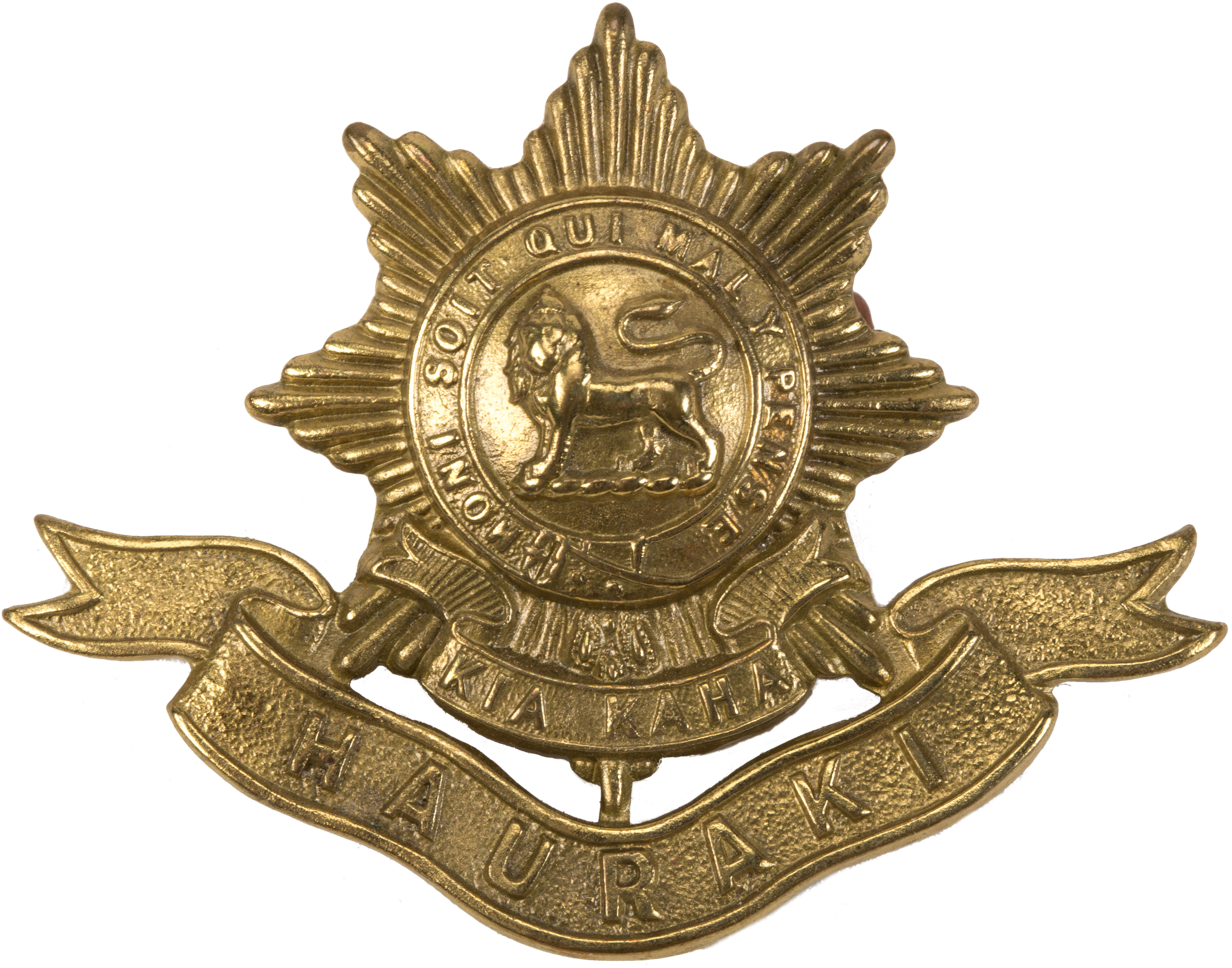
- Cap Badge of the Hauraki Regiment
- Active: 1898–2013
- Country: New Zealand
- Branch: Army (Territorial)
- Type: Infantry
- Garrison/HQ: Tauranga
- Motto: "Whaka tangata kia kaha" (Maori:"Acquit yourselves like men - be strong")
- March: The Hauraki March and Kirkhill (Pipes)
- Anniversaries: Infantry Day - 23 October

Commanders
- Current Commanding Officer (CO): Lieutenant Colonel Thomas McEntyre - Commanding Officer 3rd 6th Battalion, Royal New Zealand Infantry Regiment

Insignia
- Tartan: Royal Stewart

The Hauraki Regiment was a Territorial Force unit of the New Zealand Army. The regiment was formed as the 2nd (Hauraki) Battalion, Auckland Rifle Volunteers. Men of the Hauraki Regiment served during the First World War with the various Auckland Regiments, and with the 18th, 21st, 24th and 29th Battalions of the NZEF in the Second World War.

With the reorganisation of the army in 1964, the regiment become a TF battalion of the Royal New Zealand Infantry Regiment. This was until the later reorganisation of 1999, which saw the TF battalions split from the RNZIR to become multi-function battalion groups. The Hauraki Regiment became the 6th Hauraki Battalion Group, which housed infantry, medical and logistics units.

== History ==
In 1898, the unit was formed as the second battalion of the Auckland Rifle Volunteer, with a recruitment area around the Hauraki Gulf.

== Battle Honours ==
The following battle honours were authorised to be emblazoned on the colours:

- South Africa: 1900–02
- First World War: Landing at ANZAC, Krithia, Sari Bair, Flers -Courcelette, Messines 1917, Broodseinde, Arras 1918, Bapaume 1918, Canal Du Nord, Sambre
- Second World War: Crete, Mount Olympus, Tobruk 1941, Defence of Alamein Line, El Alamein, Tebaga Gap, The Sangro, Cassino I, The Senio, Solomons

== Alliances ==
- United Kingdom – The Royal Regiment of Fusiliers
- United Kingdom – The Rifles
- Canada – Princess Patricia's Canadian Light Infantry
- Australia – 5th/6th Battalion, Royal Victoria Regiment

== Freedoms ==
The regiment was granted the following freedoms:

- City of Rotorua (1963)
- City of Tauranga (1969)
- Borough of Tokoroa (1981)
- Borough of Paeroa (1983)
