= Royal New Zealand Infantry Regiment =

The Royal New Zealand Infantry Regiment
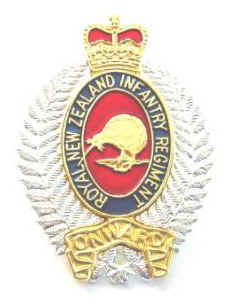
- Active: 9 January 1947 - Present
- Country: New Zealand
- Branch: New Zealand Army
- Type: Light infantry
- Size: Five battalions
- Garrison/HQ: 1st Battalion – Linton; 2/1st Battalion – Burnham; 2nd/4th Battalion; 3rd/6th Battalion; 5th/7th Battalion – Trentham
- Motto: Onward
- March: 1st Battalion - Quick – Sons of the Brave; Slow – Scipio; 2/1st Battalion - March on – Action Front; March past (quick) – The Great Little Army; March past (slow) – Scipio; March off – Army of the Nile

Commanders
- Colonel of the Regiment: Major General K.M. Gordon, CBE (Rtd)

Insignia
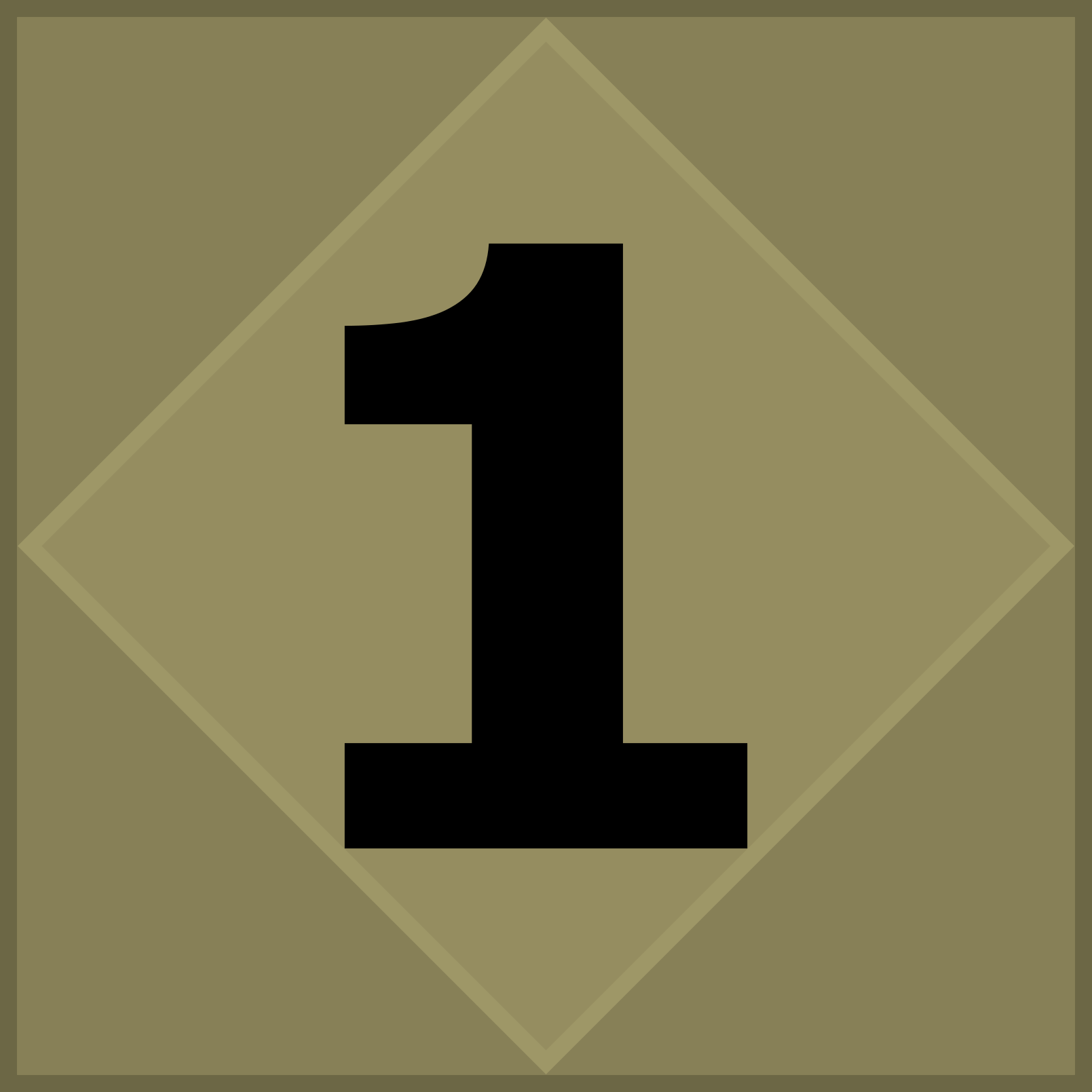
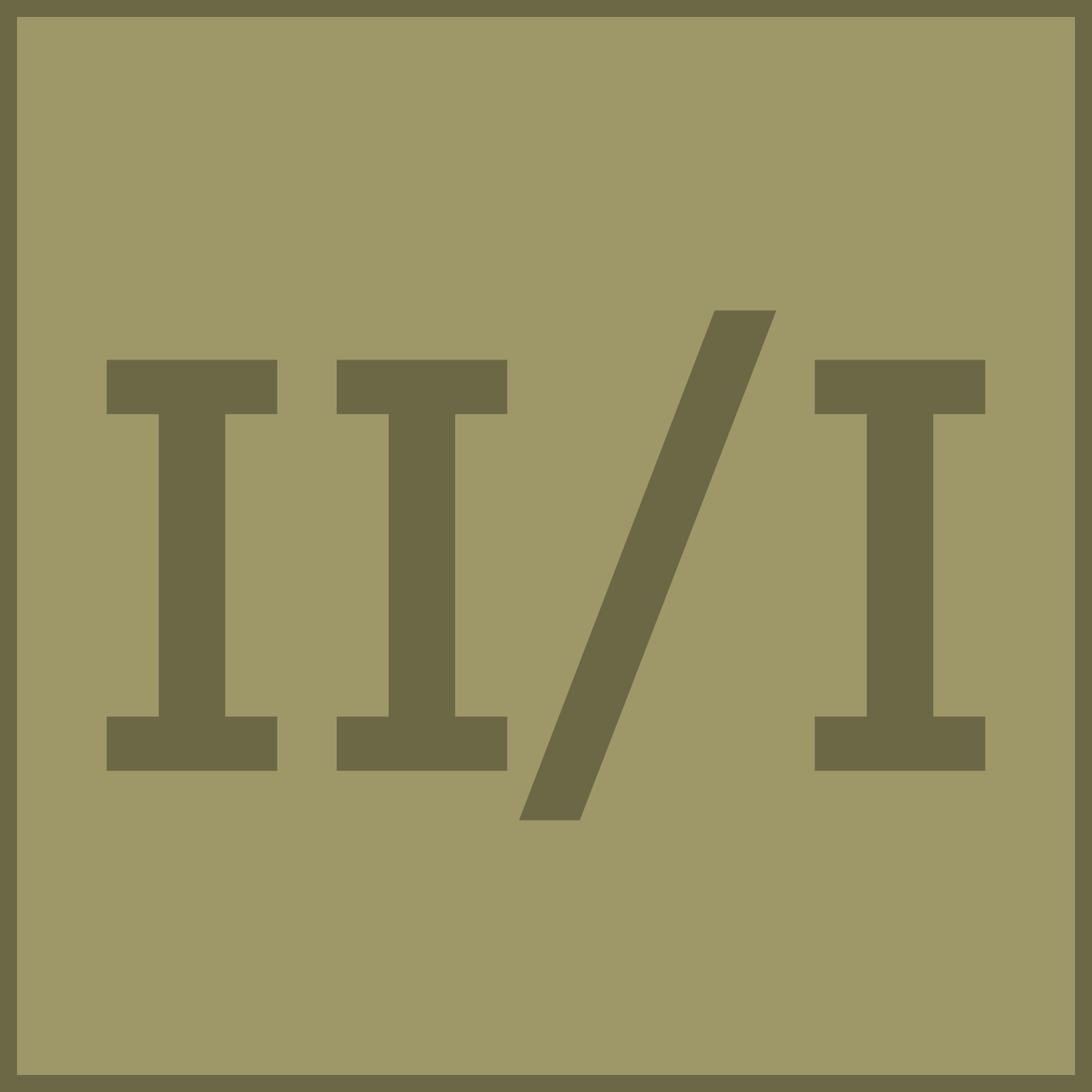
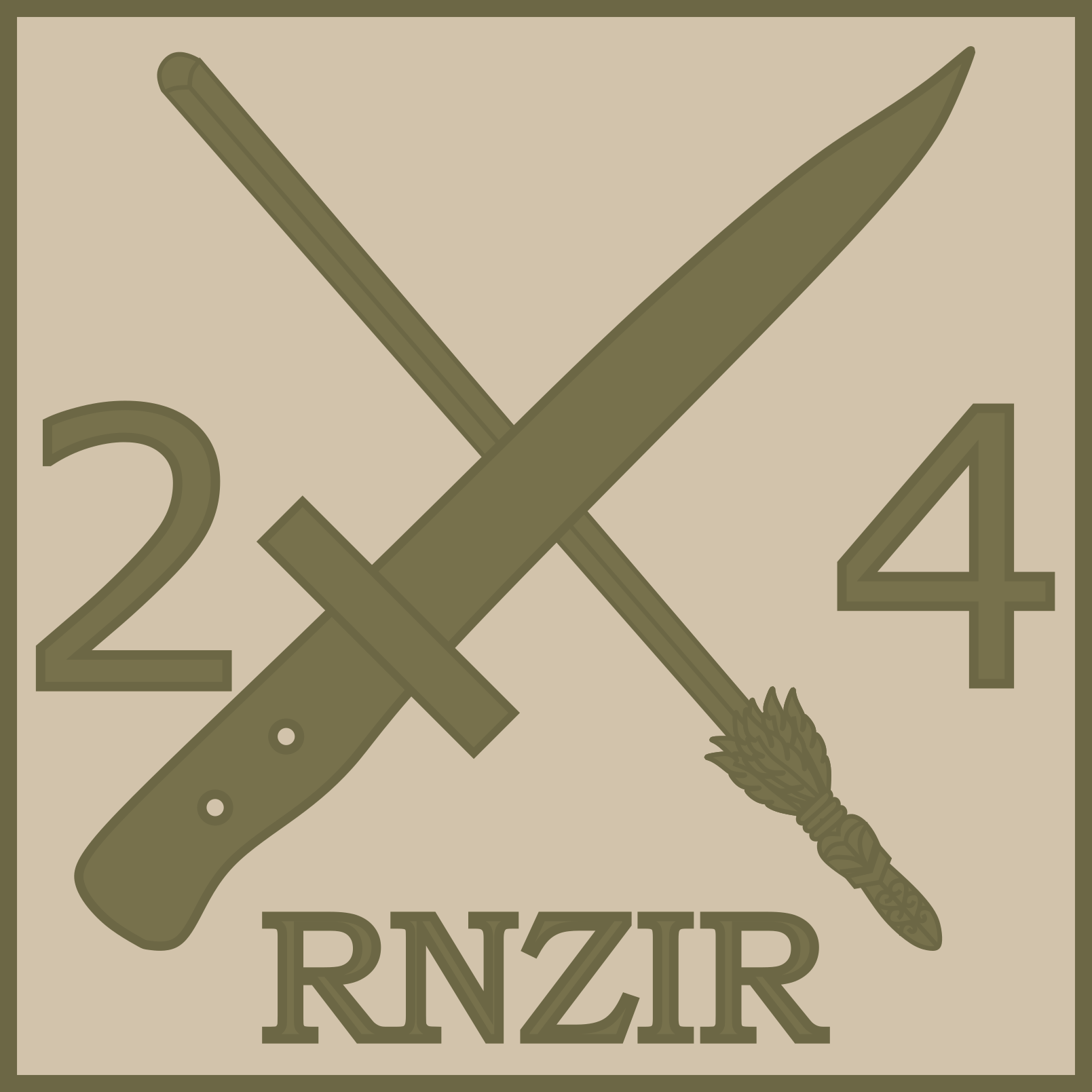
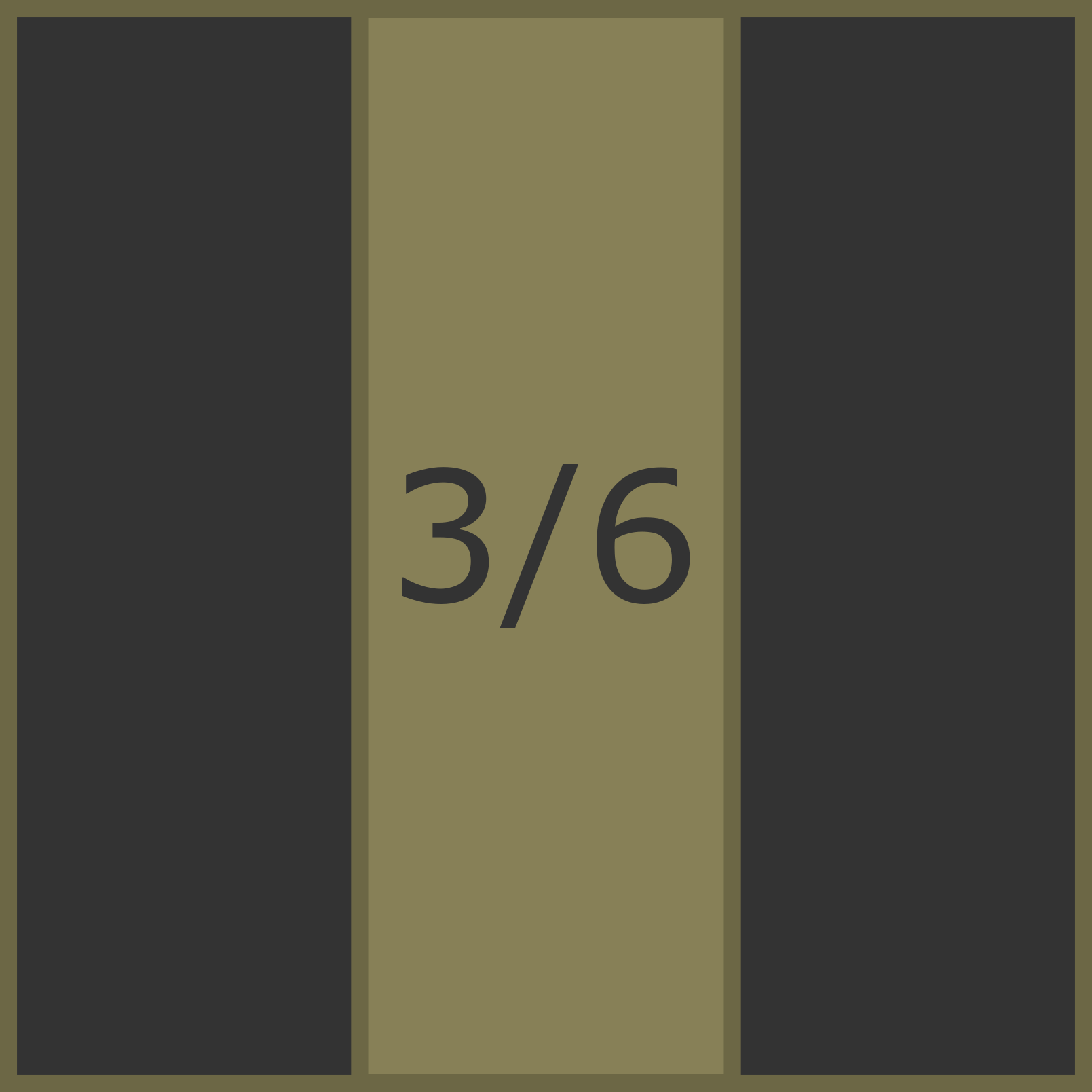
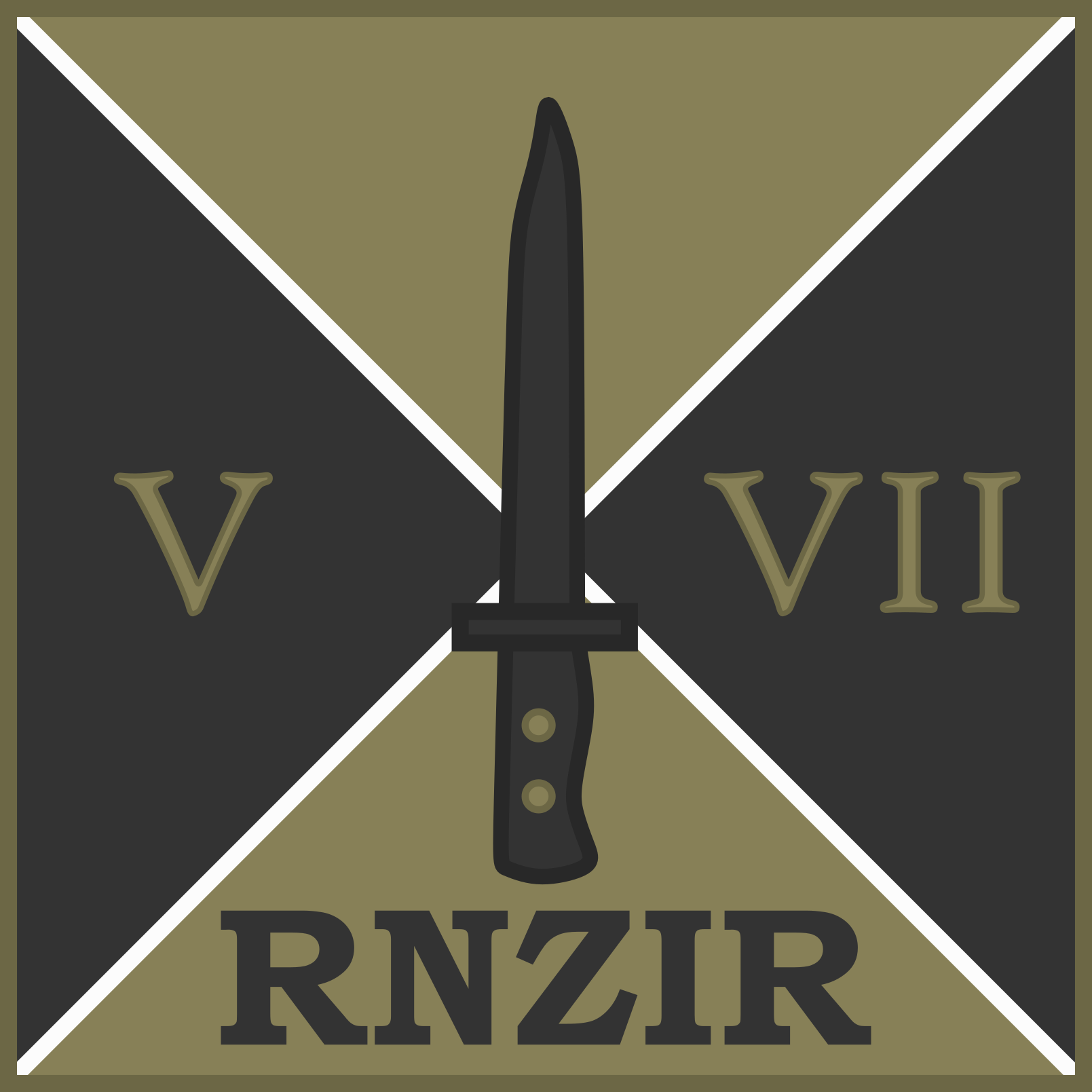
- Distinguishing Patches
- Abbreviation: RNZIR

The Royal New Zealand Infantry Regiment is the parent administrative regiment and corps of regular and reserve infantry battalions in the New Zealand Army. It was originally formed in 1947 with a singular Regular regiment and multiple reserve regiments. Over time, the regiments were turned into battalions, the reserve units amalgamated and more regular units raised and disbanded. Currently, the Regiment currently consists of two regular and three reserve battalions. Throughout its existence, units raised in this regiment have served and deployed on operations in Malaya, Vietnam, Borneo and various United Nations peacekeeping operations.

== Structure ==
The Royal New Zealand Infantry Regiment is the parent administrative unit of all infantry units in the New Zealand Army, and currently consists of two regular and three reserve infantry battalions:

- 1st Battalion (1 RNZIR) – Regular
- 2/1st Battalion (2/1 RNZIR) – Regular
- 2nd/4th Battalion (2/4 RNZIR) – Reserve
- 3rd/6th Battalion (3/6 RNZIR) – Reserve
- 5th/7th Battalion (5/7 RNZIR) – Reserve

=== Former battalions/regiments ===
==== Regiments ====
- The North Auckland Regiment,
- The Auckland (Countess of Ranfurly's Own) Regiment,
- The Hauraki Regiment,
- The Taranaki Regiment,
- The Wellington West Coast Regiment,
- The Hawke's Bay Regiment,
- The Wellington (City of Wellington's Own) Regiment,
- The Nelson, Marlborough and West Coast Regiment,
- The Canterbury Regiment,
- The Otago Regiment,
- The Southland Regiment

==== Battalions ====
- 2nd Battalion (1947–48, 1959–63 and 1964–2013), linked to 4 RNZIR
- 3rd Battalion (1947–48 and 1964–2013), linked to 6 RNZIR
- 4th Battalion (1964–2013), linked to 2 RNZIR
- 5th Battalion (1964–2013), linked to 7 RNZIR
- 6th Battalion (1964–2013), linked to 3 RNZIR
- 7th Battalion (1964–2013), linked to 5 RNZIR

== History ==
=== Formation ===
The New Zealand Infantry Corps was formed on 9 January 1947, consisting of a single Regular infantry battalion, the New Zealand Regiment, and eleven Territorial Force(TF) Infantry Regiments. However, The formation of the regular infantry battalion was only one in name and it was decided that the "1st New Zealand Regiment" should be held in abeyance until such a time that a "regular" battalion was raised. The New Zealand Infantry Corps was granted royal status in July 1947.

In August 1947, the New Zealand Regiment was reorganised with the two infantry battalions in Jayforce joining the New Zealand Regiment, which led to the original regiment to be redesignated as the 1st Battalion. The Jayforce battalions (22nd and 27th Battalions, 2NZEF) were designated the 2nd and 3rd Battalion respectively. The 2nd and 3rd Battalions were disbanded in 1948 following their return to New Zealand. During 1948 amalgamations further reduced the TF infantry regiments to nine; with the Taranaki and Wellington West Coast regiments merging, alongside the Otago and Southland regiments being merged.

=== Cold War ===
==== Malaya ====
On 2 August 1957, official authority was granted to raise and train the first "regular" infantry battalion in New Zealand history. Under the command of Lt-Col W. R. K. Morrison DSO, the 1st New Zealand Regiment would be New Zealand's land force commitment to the British Commonwealth Far East Reserve. The 1st Battalion, The New Zealand Regiment was deployed to Malaya from October 1957 as part the 28th Commonwealth Infantry Brigade Group. Between 1958 and 1964 the NZ Regiment would rotate three battalions through Malaya. The 1st Battalion, NZ Regiment, was deployed between the periods of 1957 to 1959 and 1961 to 1963, with the 2nd Battalion, NZ Regiment, was rotated in during 1959 to 1961 and 1963 to 1965; though the 1st Battalion Royal New Zealand Infantry Regiment was formed on 1 May 1964.

This deployment would be unique in New Zealand military history, as it would be the first time that families would accompany a New Zealand overseas military deployment to an overseas location. In 1963, the 2nd Battalion now based in New Zealand was reorganised as a depot for the 1st Battalion (??-DB).

==== Infantry reorganisation ====
On 1 April 1964, all units of the Royal New Zealand Infantry Corps were reorganised into the Royal New Zealand Infantry Regiment and re-designated as;

- 1 RNZIR – 1st Battalion, Royal New Zealand Infantry Regiment (Regular)
- 2 RNZIR – 2nd Battalion, (Canterbury, and Nelson-Marlborough and West Coast), Royal New Zealand Infantry Regiment
- 3 RNZIR – 3rd Battalion, (Auckland (Countess of Ranfurly's Own) and Northland), Royal New Zealand Infantry Regiment
- 4 RNZIR – 4th Battalion, (Otago and Southland), Royal New Zealand Infantry Regiment
- 5 RNZIR – 5th Battalion, (Wellington West Coast and Taranaki), Royal New Zealand Infantry Regiment
- 6 RNZIR – 6th Battalion, (Hauraki), Royal New Zealand Infantry Regiment
- 7 RNZIR – 7th Battalion, (Wellington (City of Wellington's Own) and Hawke's Bay), Royal New Zealand Infantry Regiment

==== Indonesia-Malaysia Confrontation ====
During the Indonesia-Malaysia confrontation which began on 20 January 1963, 1 RNZIR would be committed to the conflict from September 1964, seeing service in Mainland Malaysia and Borneo.

1 RNZIR would initially see action in September 1964 when Indonesian paratroopers landed in Johore, 1 RNZIR was one of the few Commonwealth units in the region and with the New Zealand government's permission hunted down the infiltrators. The following month, 52 Indonesian soldiers landed in Pontian on the Johore-Malacca border and were also captured by New Zealand soldiers. 1 RNZIR would later deploy to Borneo where they would combat Indonesian cross border infiltration. The Indonesia-Malaysia Confrontation officially ended in May 1966.

==== Vietnam War ====
During the Vietnam War, 1 RNZIR which remained at Terendak Camp in Malaysia, would contribute a series of Rifle companies to serve with the 1st Australian Task Force (1 ATF) in South Vietnam.

Initially the first Victor Company served with various Australian regiments for six months in 1967. The subsequent Victor rotation and additional Whiskey Company were merged with an Australian Battalion to become the "ANZAC battalion" in March 1968. As each Australian and New Zealand rotation occurred a new "ANZAC battalion" was formed. New Zealand Assault pioneer and Mortar teams accompanied subsequent rotations.

Additionally, a troop of New Zealand Special Air Service arrived in 1968 and conducted operations with the Australian SAS. Subsequent NZSAS rotations served until February 1971.

RNZIR personnel served in many different roles at the 1ATF base and at the New Zealand Headquarters in Saigon. All New Zealand combat forces were withdrawn in December 1971.

==== Singapore ====
Having been based at Terendak Camp since 1961, 1 RNZIR relocated to Nee Soon Barracks on Singapore in December 1969. In 1971 the 28th Commonwealth Infantry Brigade Group would be disestablished and 1 RNZIR would come under the command of ANZUK Force. In June 1971 1 RNZIR would relocate from Nee Soon to Dieppe Barracks. In 1974 ANZUK Force was disbanded and 1 RNZIR became the Infantry component of the New Zealand Force South East Asia which it would remain a part of until 1989 when 1 RNZIR was redeployed to Linton Camp in New Zealand.

==== Further regular battalions ====
In 1973, the Regimental Depot in Burnham Camp was predesignated as the 2/1st Battalion, Royal New Zealand Infantry Battalion, creating for the first time since 1948 a second regular infantry battalion in the New Zealand Army. Today, the RNZIR has two regular battalions: the 1st Battalion, Royal New Zealand Infantry Regiment, and the 2/1st Battalion, Royal New Zealand Infantry Regiment. An additional battalion, known as the 3/1st Battalion RNZIR, was occasionally formed as a composite battalion from the Territorial Battalions during exercises.

The 1st Ranger Company was briefly raised as an independent infantry company from 1987-1989. The initial training course drew all its directing staff from the New Zealand Special Air Service. The name 'Rangers' was chosen as a reference to Gustavus von Tempsky (1828–1868) who raised a fighting unit during the New Zealand Wars known as 'von Tempsky's Bush Rangers'. The company was raised in October 1987 and disbanded in late 1989.

=== Peacekeeping ===
==== Somalia ====
In the first deployment of New Zealand combat troops to a war zone since the Vietnam War, 1 RNZIR contributed a rifle section to provide security for the New Zealand Supply Contingent in Somalia from July 1993. There would be two rotations with the final section departing Somalia in June 1994.

==== Former Yugoslavia ====
Alongside troops from Queens Alexandra's Mounted Rifles (QAMR), 1 RNZIR and 2/ RNZIR would both contribute to the Mechanized Infantry Company Group that formed New Zealand's commitment to the United Nations Protection Force (UNPROFOR). Serving as part of a British Battalion from 1994, two Company Group rotations would serve in the Former Yugoslavia.

=== Recent history (2000–present) ===
==== Amalgamations ====
On 17 March 2013 the six TF battalions were amalgamated into the current three reserve battalions;

- 2nd/4th Battalion, Royal New Zealand Infantry Regiment (2/4 RNZIR), from the 2nd Battalion (Canterbury and Nelson-Marlborough and West Coast), RNZIR, and the 4th Battalion (Otago and Southland) RNZIR
- 3rd/6th Battalion, Royal New Zealand Infantry Regiment (3/6 RNZIR), from the 3rd Battalion (Auckland [Countess of Ranfurly's Own] and Northland), RNZIR, and the 6th Battalion (Hauraki) RNZIR
- 5th/7th Battalion, Royal New Zealand Infantry Regiment (5/7 RNZIR), from the 5th Battalion (Wellington West Coast and Taranaki) RNZIR, and the 7th Battalion (Wellington [City of Wellington's Own], Hawkes Bay) RNZIR.

On the 5th of December 2025 the Queen Alexandra's Mounted Rifles (QAMR) were formally amalgamated into the 1st Battalion Royal New Zealand Infantry Regiment, which would now become a motorized infantry battalion: "The new unit will retain the name 1 RNZIR and will be organised as a Motorised Infantry Battalion, with one of its sub-units retaining the QAMR name."

== Organisation ==
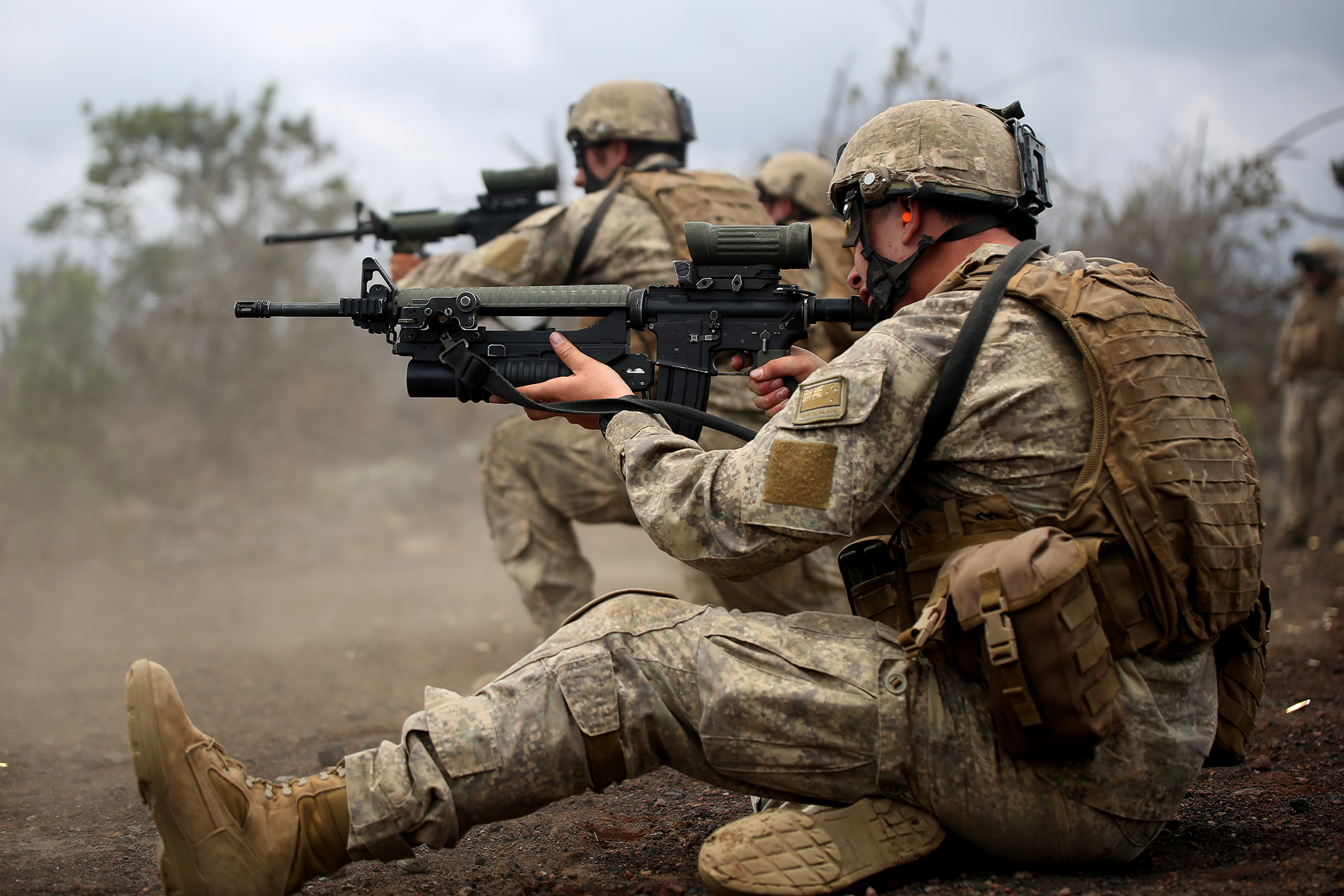
A New Zealand soldier fires a Canadian C7A2 service rifle during the US-NZ-CA joint Rim of the Pacific (RIMPAC) Exercise, July 2014

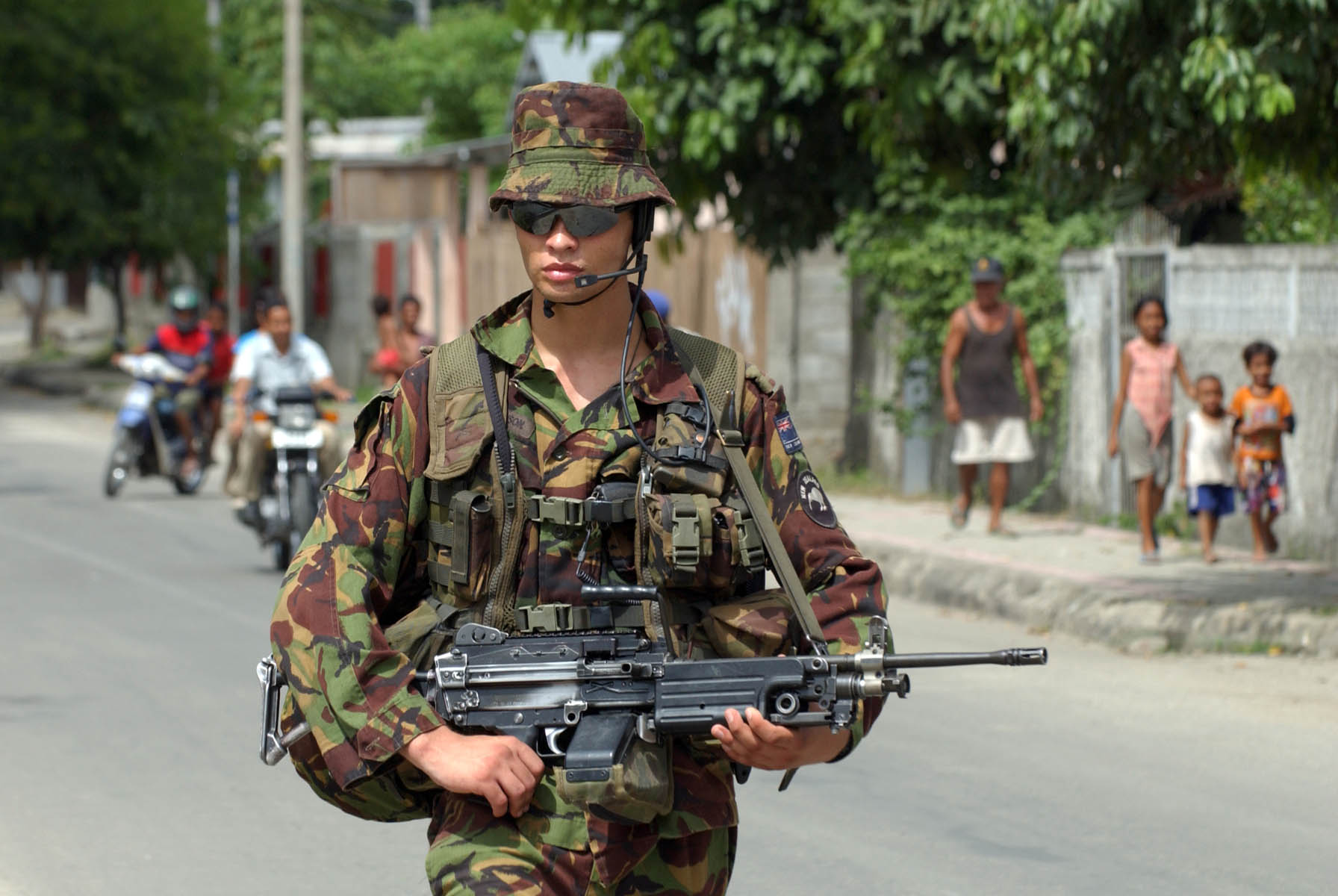
A member of 1 RNZIR in East Timor during 2007

In the New Zealand Army, an infantry platoon is commanded by a second lieutenant or a lieutenant with a Platoon Sergeant (holding the rank of sergeant), a Platoon Signaller and a medic (where relevant) comprising the Platoon Headquarters. The platoon is sub-divided into three sections of between 7–10 soldiers, each commanded by a corporal with a lance corporal as the Section second-in-command (Section 2iC). Each section can be sub-divided into two fire-teams, commanded by the Section Commander and 2iC respectively, as well as normal two-man Scout, Rifle and Gun Teams. In recent years the section organisation consists of the two fire team concept, where the section is divided into two fire teams with a Gun Team in each and one commanded by the section corporal and the other section lance corporal with a section marksmen in each team and the leftover riflemen divided equally among the two fire teams. The section corporal is still in overall command and is in contact with the other fire team via radio if the situation changes.

There are three platoons in a rifle company, which is commanded by a major, and three rifle companies within an infantry battalion, which is commanded by a lieutenant colonel. An infantry battalion will also contain an organic Support Company including a signals platoon, mortar platoon (mortars now officially under the artillery corps but still used by infantry on deployment), Direct Fire Support Weapons Platoon which includes anti-armor, heavy machine guns and automatic grenade launchers, Reconnaissance Platoon and Sniper cell, and a Logistics Company (transport and stores). A battalion typically totals around 400 to 500 soldiers depending on actual manning levels.

== Theatre and battle honours ==
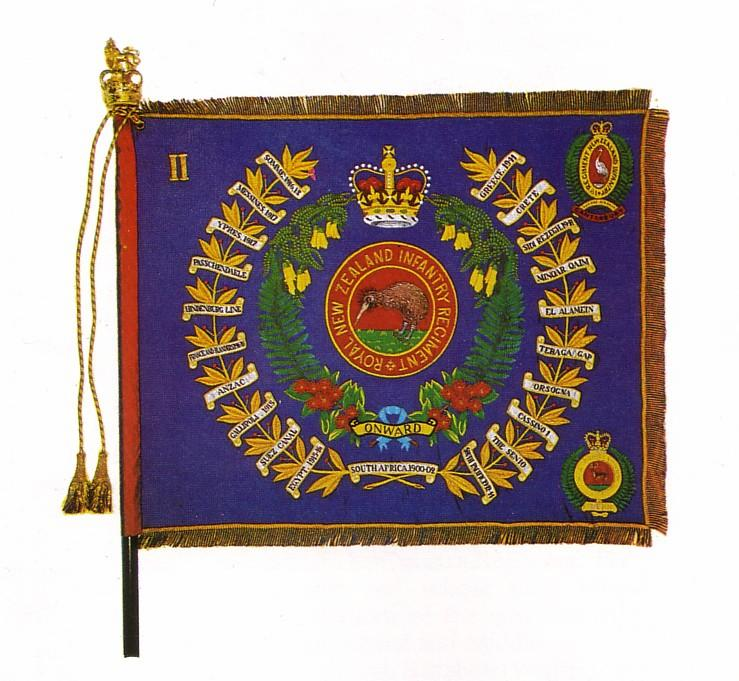
Regimental colour of the 2nd Battalion

Because it is recruited on a nationwide basis and has no specific regional links, the Royal New Zealand Infantry Regiment claims descent from the old New Zealand Regiment and all previous Territorial Infantry Regiments of the New Zealand Army. As a consequence, it is permitted to display a selection of 105 battle honours awarded to ten separate regiments:

- New Zealand
- South Africa 1900–02
- The Great War: Anzac, Gallipoli 1915, Somme 1916 '18, Messines 1917, Ypres 1917, Polygon Wood, Passchendaele, Arras 1918, Hindenburg Line, France and Flanders 1916–18
- World War II: Greece 1941, Crete, Minqar Qaim, El Alamein, Takrouna, North Africa 1940–43, Cassino I, The Senio, Italy 1943–44, South Pacific 1942–44
- South Vietnam 1967–71 (Note: This is the only battle honour awarded to a New Zealand unit since 1945)

== Alliances ==
The Royal New Zealand Infantry Regiment currently maintains the following alliances:

- United Kingdom – The Royal Highland Fusiliers (1 RNZIR)
- United Kingdom – The Rifles (1 RNZIR, 2/4 RNZIR, 5/7 RNZIR) (Note: 3/6 RNZIR had a battalion specific alliance with 4th Battalion, The Rifles until 2021 when 4 Rifles was transferred to the Ranger Regiment.)
- United Kingdom – Royal Gurkha Rifles (2/1 RNZIR)
- United Kingdom – Princess of Wales's Royal Regiment (2/4 RNZIR, 5/7 RNZIR)
- United Kingdom – Duke of Lancaster's Regiment (2/4 RNZIR, 5/7 RNZIR)
- United Kingdom – Royal Anglian Regiment (3/6 RNZIR)
- United Kingdom – Royal Regiment of Fusiliers (3/6 RNZIR)
- Australia – Royal Australian Regiment (1 RNZIR)
- Australia – 5th/6th Battalion, Royal Victoria Regiment (3/6 RNZIR)
- Malaysia – 7th Battalion, Royal Malay Regiment (1 RNZIR)
- Singapore – 1st Commando Battalion (1 RNZIR)

== Lineage of Reserve Battalions ==
1911	1914	1921	1923	1948	1964	2013
1st (Canterbury) Regiment		Canterbury Regiment			2nd Battalion, RNZIR	2nd/4th Battalion, RNZIR
2nd (South Canterbury) Regiment		Canterbury Regiment			2nd Battalion, RNZIR	2nd/4th Battalion, RNZIR
12th (Nelson and Marlborough) Regiment		2nd Battalion, Canterbury Regiment	Nelson, Marlborough and West Coast Regiment		2nd Battalion, RNZIR	2nd/4th Battalion, RNZIR
13th (North Canterbury and Westland) Regiment		2nd Battalion, Canterbury Regiment	Nelson, Marlborough and West Coast Regiment		2nd Battalion, RNZIR	2nd/4th Battalion, RNZIR
4th (Otago) Regiment		Otago Regiment		Otago and Southland Regiment	4th Battalion, RNZIR	2nd/4th Battalion, RNZIR
10th (North Otago) Regiment		Otago Regiment		Otago and Southland Regiment	4th Battalion, RNZIR	2nd/4th Battalion, RNZIR
8th (Southland) Regiment		2nd Battalion, Otago Regiment	Southland Regiment	Otago and Southland Regiment	4th Battalion, RNZIR	2nd/4th Battalion, RNZIR
14th (South Otago) Regiment		2nd Battalion, Otago Regiment	Southland Regiment	Otago and Southland Regiment	4th Battalion, RNZIR	2nd/4th Battalion, RNZIR
3rd (Auckland) Regiment (Countess of Ranfurly's Own)		Auckland Regiment (Countess of Ranfurly's Own)			3rd Battalion, RNZIR	3rd/6th Battalion, RNZIR
15th (North Auckland) Regiment		3rd Battalion, Auckland Regiment	North Auckland Regiment^{a}		3rd Battalion, RNZIR	3rd/6th Battalion, RNZIR
6th (Hauraki) Regiment		2nd Battalion, Auckland Regiment	Hauraki Regiment		6th Battalion, RNZIR	3rd/6th Battalion, RNZIR
7th (Wellington West Coast) Regiment		2nd Battalion, Wellington Regiment	Wellington West Coast Regiment	Wellington West Coast and Taranaki Regiment	5th Battalion, RNZIR	5th/7th Battalion, RNZIR
11th Regiment (Taranaki Rifles)		4th Battalion, Wellington Regiment	Taranaki Regiment	Wellington West Coast and Taranaki Regiment	5th Battalion, RNZIR	5th/7th Battalion, RNZIR
5th (Wellington) Regiment		Wellington Regiment (City of Wellington's Own)			7th Battalion, RNZIR	5th/7th Battalion, RNZIR
9th (Wellington East Coast) Regiment	9th (Hawke's Bay) Regiment	3rd Battalion, Wellington Regiment	Hawke's Bay Regiment		7th Battalion, RNZIR	5th/7th Battalion, RNZIR
9th (Wellington East Coast) Regiment	17th (Ruahine) Regiment	3rd Battalion, Wellington Regiment	Hawke's Bay Regiment		7th Battalion, RNZIR	5th/7th Battalion, RNZIR

^{a} Northland Regiment from 1951

== Order of precedence ==
Preceded by Royal New Zealand Corps of Signals	New Zealand Army Order of Precedence	Succeeded by New Zealand Special Air Service

== Notes ==
Footnotes

Citations
