= 5th/7th Battalion, Royal New Zealand Infantry Regiment =

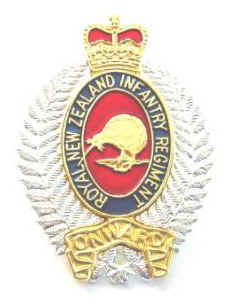
- Cap badge of the Royal New Zealand Infantry Regiment
- Active: December 2012 – Present
- Country: New Zealand
- Allegiance: HM The King
- Branch: Army
- Type: Reserve (Territorial Force)
- Role: Light Infantry
- Size: Three companies
- Garrison/HQ: HQ - Trentham; Wellington Company - Trentham; West Coast Company - Wanganui; East Coast Company - Napier
- Motto: Onward
- March: 5th Battalion - 7th Battalion - Wellington and The Dashing White Sergeant

Commanders
- Commanding officer: Lieutenant Colonel Shaun O'Connor
- Regimental Sergeant-Major: Warrant Officer Class One Murray Macaulay

Insignia
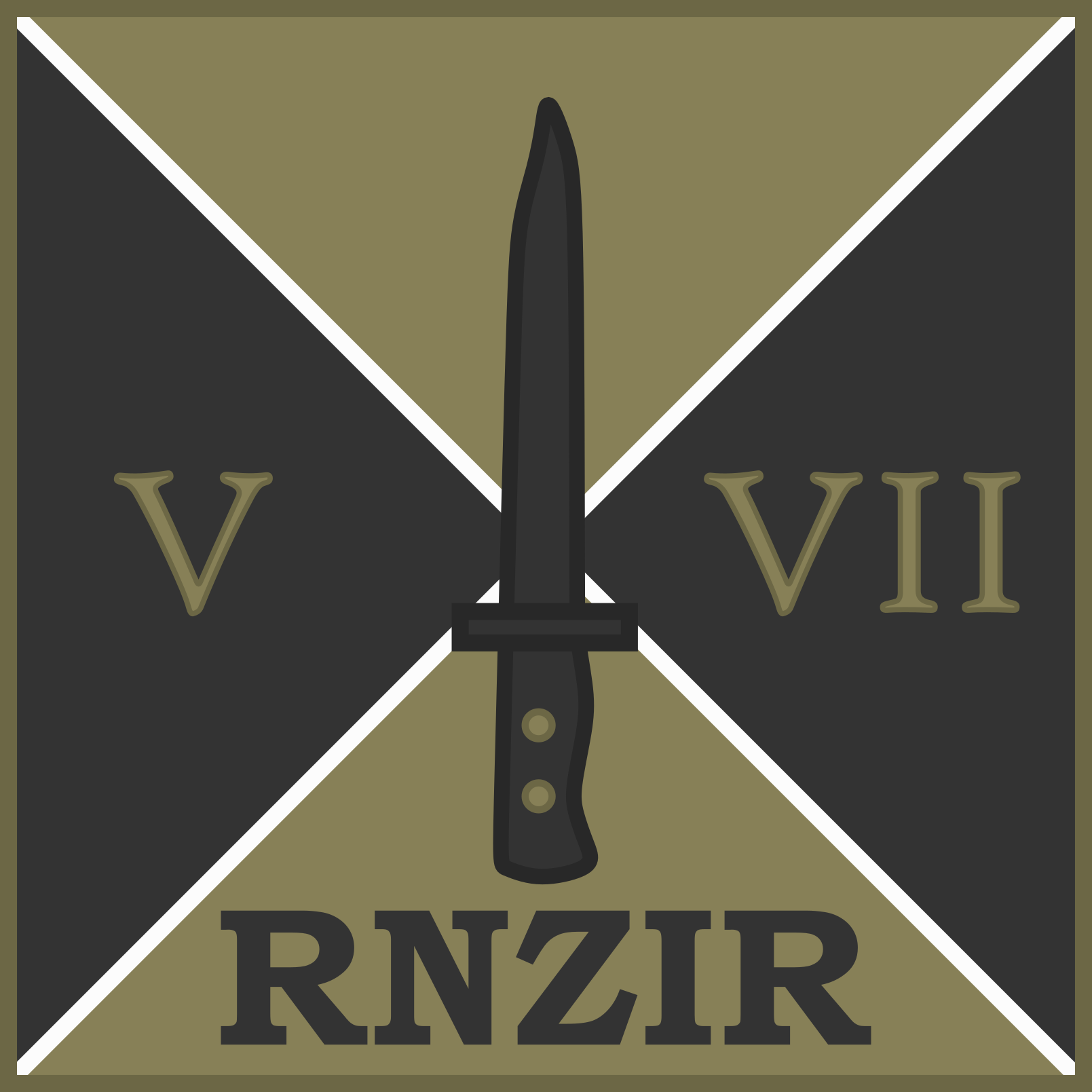
- Distinguishing Patch

The 5th/7th Battalion, Royal New Zealand Infantry Regiment is an Army Reserve infantry battalion of the Royal New Zealand Infantry Regiment with its headquarters in Trentham, New Zealand.

== History ==
The 7th Battalion, RNZIR was formed in 1964 during the reorganisation of the army by the amalgamation of two separate regiments:

- Wellington Regiment (City of Wellington's Own)
- Hawke's Bay Regiment (which had earlier incorporated the Ruahine Regiment)

In 1948 the Wellington West Coast Regiment amalgamated with the Taranaki Regiment to form The Wellington West Coast & Taranaki Regiment.

In 1964 The Wellington West Coast & Taranaki Regiment became the 5th Battalion, RNZIR.

In 1974 further name changes occurred to reflect each units historical links -

- 5th (Wellington West Coast & Taranaki) Battalion, RNZIR.
- 7th (Wellington (City of Wellington's Own) and Hawke's Bay) Battalion, RNZIR.

The respective amalgamations saw the new regiments become Territorial Force battalions of the Royal New Zealand Infantry Regiment. This lasted until another reorganisation in 1999, which saw the TF battalions split from the RNZIR to become multi-function battalion groups.

Then again in 2012 the territorial force reorganised with the battalion groups splitting and the former units rejoining their parent corps and regiments. The infantry battalions were amalgamated from six to three, this included the 5th and 7th Battalions which amalgamated to form the 5th/7th Battalion, Royal New Zealand Infantry Regiment.

== Current structure and role ==
The Battalion has three regionally based Rifle Companies:

- Wellington Company, based in the Wellington Region, carrying on the traditions of the Wellington Regiment (City of Wellington's Own).
- West Coast Company, based in the Manawatū-Whanganui and Taranaki Regions, carrying on the traditions of the Wellington West Coast Regiment and Taranaki Regiment.
- East Coast Company, based in the Hawkes Bay and Gisborne Regions, carrying on the traditions of the Hawke's Bay Regiment and Ruahine Regiment.

The Battalion Headquarters is located at Trentham Camp in Upper Hutt, along with Wellington Company, with other locations at Linton Camp, Whanganui, New Plymouth, Napier and Gisborne.

The Battalion is paired with the 1st Battalion, Royal New Zealand Infantry Regiment.

The Battalion trains individuals and force elements to round out and backfill regular force units both on international deployments and at home. It is a light infantry battalion, although it is tasked with providing individuals and force elements for a Motorised Infantry Battalion Group (MIBG) for operations.

The Battalion also has an important role in supporting civilian agencies during times of emergency. The Battalion maintains regular liaison with Regional Civil Defence Emergency Management Groups and provides local support in the event of natural disasters or other emergencies. This was demonstrated by the Battalion's significant involvement in the response to Cyclone Gabrielle in the Gisborne, Hawke's Bay and Wellington Regions in February 2023.

== Regimental bands ==
Until 30 June 2012, both battalions each had a regimental band or regimental pipes and drums. But funding to the territorial force bands was cut in favour of keeping the full-time New Zealand Army Band. Both the former Regimental Pipes and Drums of the 5th (Wellington West Coast and Taranaki) Battalion, RNZIR and the Regimental Band of the 7th (Wellington (City of Wellington's Own) and Hawke's Bay) Battalion, RNZIR continue as incorporated societies while retaining their respective uniforms, rank, instruments and band rooms. Notably, the 7th Battalion Band performed at Government House, Wellington for the territorial force amalgamation parade in March 2013.

== Battle honours ==
- 5th (Wellington West Coast & Taranaki) Battalion
  - New Zealand
  - South Africa
  - First World War: Somme 1916–18, Messines 1917, Ypres 1917, Bapaume 1918, Hindenburg Line, Landing at ANZAC, France and Flanders 1916–1918, Sari Bair 1915, Gallipoli 1915, Egypt 1915–1916
  - Second World War: Greece 1941, Crete, Sidi Rezegh 1941, Minquar Qaim, El Alamein, North Africa 1940–1943, Cassino I, The Senio, Italy 1943–45, Solomons

The 5th (Wellington West Coast & Taranaki) Battalion is one of two unique units of the Commonwealth, in that it is one of two units to have its own country's name as a battle honour. This dates from the service of the Taranaki Volunteer Rifle Corps, from which the Taranaki Regiment is descended, during the New Zealand Wars, specifically in the Battle of Waireka.

The other unit to share this honour is the Cape Town Highlanders Regiment a reserve mechanised unit of South African Army.

- 7th (Wellington (City of Wellington's Own) and Hawke's Bay) Battalion
  - South Africa 1900–02
  - First World War: Somme 1916–18, Messines 1917, Ypres 1917, Bapaume 1918, Hindenburg Line, Sambre (Le Quesnoy), Landing at ANZAC, France and Flanders 1916–18, Sari Bair, Gallipoli 1915
  - Second World War: Greece 1941, Crete, Tobruk 1941, Minquar Qaim, El Alamein, Tebaga Gap, The Sangro, Cassino I, The Senio, Solomons 1942–44

== Alliances ==
- United Kingdom – Princess of Wales's Royal Regiment (Queen's and Royal Hampshires)
- United Kingdom – The Highlanders
- United Kingdom – The Duke of Lancaster's Regiment (King's Lancashire and Border)
- Canada – The Lincoln and Welland Regiment
