= Wellington (City of Wellington's Own) and Hawke's Bay Regiment =

The Wellington (City of Wellington's Own) and Hawke's Bay Regiment
- Active: 1964–2012
- Country: New Zealand
- Branch: New Zealand Army
- Type: Infantry
- Garrison/HQ: Napier
- Motto: Kia Toa (Maori: "be brave")
- March: The Wellington Regiment; The Dashing White Sergeant
- Anniversaries: Chunuck Bair Day - 8 August

Insignia

The Wellington (City of Wellington's Own) and Hawke's Bay Regiment was a Territorial Force (TF) regiment of the New Zealand Army. It was formed in 1964 during the reorganisation of the army by the amalgamation of two separate regiments:

- Wellington Regiment (City of Wellington's Own)
- Hawke's Bay Regiment (which had earlier incorporated the Ruahine Regiment)

This amalgamation saw the new regiment become a TF battalion of the Royal New Zealand Infantry Regiment. This was until the later reorganisation of 1999, which saw the TF battalions split from the RNZIR to become multi-function battalion groups. The Wellington and Hawke's Bay Regiment became the 7th Wellington and Hawke's Bay Battalion Group, with the following unit types:

- Infantry
  - Alpha Company, was based in Gisborne
  - Bravo Company, was based at Trentham Camp in Wellington
  - Charlie Company, was based in Napier
- Artillery – There was some discussion of converting 22(D) Battery, RNZA in the Wellington region into an Air Defence sub-unit
- Medical – Now under the command of 2nd Health Services Battalion (2HSB) in Linton
- Logistics
- Military Band

In December 2012 the regiment was amalgamated with the 5th Wellington West Coast Taranaki Battalion Group to form the 5/7 Battalion, Royal New Zealand Infantry Regiment (5/7 RNZIR).

== Battle honours ==
The following battle honours were authorised to be emblazoned on the colours:

- South Africa 1900–02
- First World War: Somme 1916–18, Messines 1917, Ypres 1917, Bapaume 1918, Hindenburg Line, Sambre (Le Quesnoy), Landing at ANZAC, France and Flanders 1916–18, Chunuk Bair, Sari Bair, Gallipoli 1915
- Second World War: Greece 1941, Crete, Tobruk 1941, Minquar Qaim, El Alamein, Tebaga Gap, The Sangro, Cassino I, The Senio, Solomons 1942–44

== Alliances ==
- United Kingdom – The Highlanders
- United Kingdom – The Duke of Lancaster's Regiment (King's Lancashire and Border)
- Canada – The Lincoln and Welland Regiment

== Freedoms ==
The regiment was granted the following freedoms:

- City of Wellington (1938)
- City of Napier (1957)
- City of Gisborne (1979)
