= Wellington Infantry Regiment (NZEF) =

- Active: 1914–1919
- Country: New Zealand
- Allegiance: British Empire
- Branch: New Zealand Military Forces
- Role: Infantry
- Size: 3 Battalions
- Part of: New Zealand and Australian Division (1915–1916); New Zealand Division (1916–1919)
- Engagements: Egypt 1915–16, Gallipoli Campaign, France and Flanders 1916–18, Battle of the Somme, Battle of Messines (1917), Ypres 1917, Battle of Passchendaele, Battle of Bapaume 1918, Battle of Cambrai (1918)

Commanders
- Notable commanders: William Malone † (1914–1915)

Insignia

The Wellington Infantry Regiment was a military unit of the New Zealand Expeditionary Force (NZEF) raised for service in the First World War. It saw service in the Gallipoli Campaign (1915) and on the Western Front (1916–1919). The regiment was formed by grouping together companies from four different territorial regiments base in the Wellington Military district.

== History ==
The regiment was formed in 1914 as the Wellington Battalion. The battalion consisted of four rifle companies, with each company raised from one of the territorial regiments of the Wellington military district, namely the:

- 7th (Wellington West Coast) Regiment
- 9th (Hawke's Bay) Regiment
- 11th Regiment (Taranaki Rifles)
- 17th (Ruahine) Regiment

Each company retained the name and cap badge of its parent territorial regiment.

Before the Wellington battalion was formed the 5th (Wellington) Regiment had already been mostly dispatched to capture Samoa as part of the Samoa Expeditionary Force. The 5th (Wellington) Regiment was therefore not integrated into the Wellington Battalion and was, ironically, not affiliated with the Wellington Infantry Regiment.

== Battle honours ==
- First World War:
  - Gallipoli Campaign,
  - Western Front,
  - Somme 1916,
  - Messines 1917,
  - Ypres 1917,
  - Passchendaele 1917,

== Mascot ==
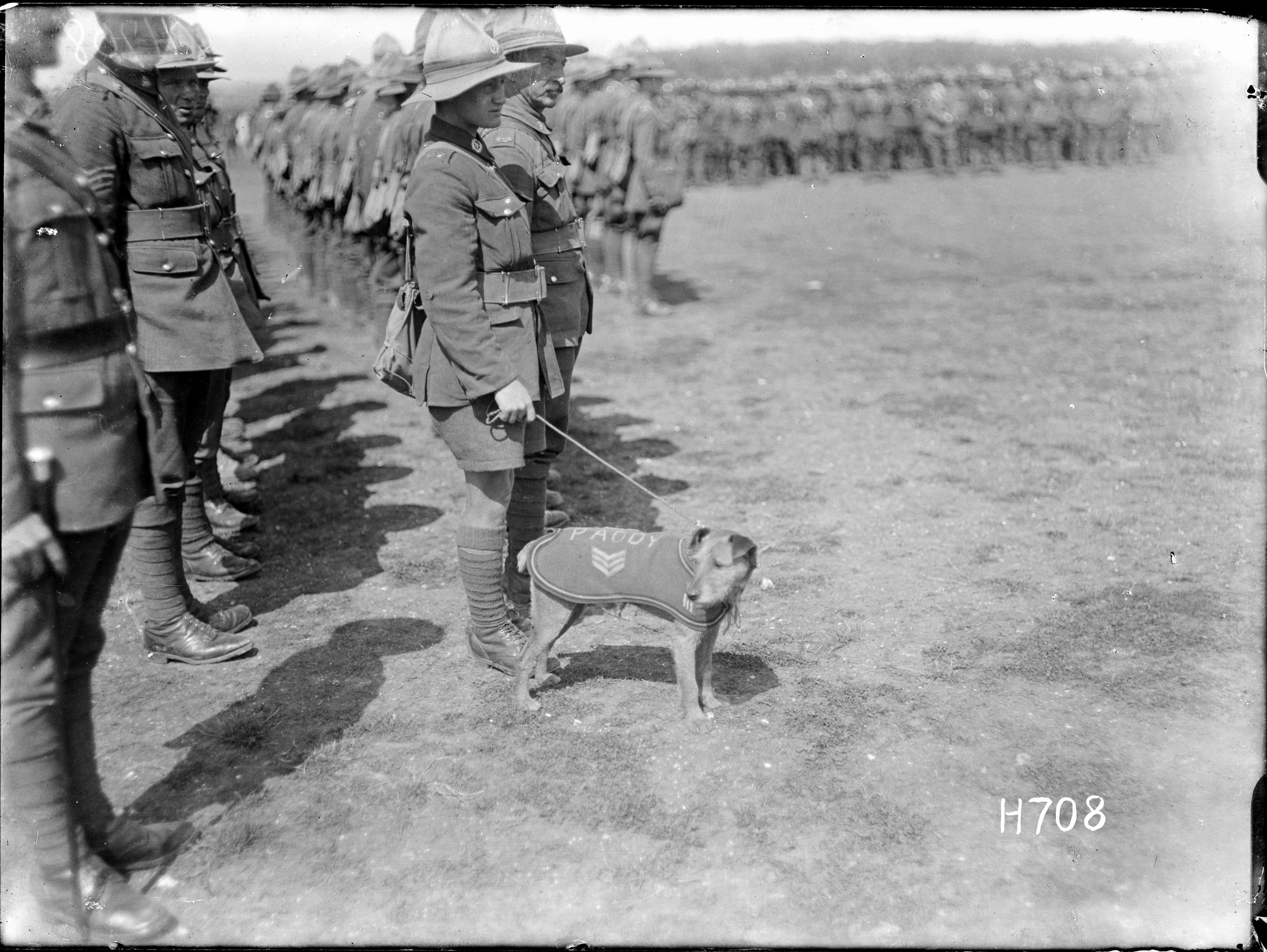
Paddy at an inspection of the Wellington Regiment by Prime Minister William Massey. Vauchelles, France, 30 June 1918

The Wellington Regiment adopted an Irish Terrier, known as Scout Sergeant Major Paddy, as the regimental mascot. Paddy was originally adopted as the mascot of the 7th (Wellington West Coast) Regiment prior to the First World War. He joined the Wellington Battalion as a Private at the beginning of the war. Initially Lt. Col. Malone would not allow Paddy to travel with the battalion to Egypt. After an appeal to the brigade major, however, permission was granted and Paddy sailed for Egypt with the Battalion on 16 October 1914.

Paddy landed at Gallipoli on the afternoon of 25 April 1915 and was present during much of the fighting. He led the charge for a number of attacks and on one occasion reached the Turkish trenches before the men did. In May, Paddy became detached from the Wellington Battalion for several days, but was eventually found deaf and shell shocked. Paddy's condition improved after the evacuation from Gallipoli and he was there after attached to the Quartermaster's staff. He stayed with the Wellington Regiment until the end of the war and was eventually promoted to Scout Sergeant Major.

Paddy went with the regiment to Germany as part of the occupation force at the end of the war and later ended up in England. Plans were made to return him to New Zealand, but scares over rabies and quarantine requirements delayed his return. It was not until 1922 that finally plans were made for his return, by which time it was decided he was too frail to make the trip back home. He spent the rest of his life in Devon and died in 1929 at the age of 16.
