= Wellington West =

Wellington West may refer to:

- Wellington West (electoral district), a former electoral district Ontario, Canada
- Wellington Street West, a road west of downtown Ottawa, Ontario
- Wellington West (New Zealand electorate), a former electorate in New Zealand
- Wellington West Coast Regiment, a Territorial Force unit of the New Zealand Army
- Wellington West Coast and Taranaki Regiment, a Territorial Force unit of the New Zealand Army
- Queen Alexandra's 2nd (Wellington West Coast) Mounted Rifles, a mounted regiment of the New Zealand Army
