= Otago Regiment =

Otago Regiment may refer to:

- Otago Mounted Rifles Regiment (1911–1921)
- Otago Infantry Regiment (NZEF) (1914–1919)
- Otago Regiment (1921–1948) training and recruitment regiment
- Otago and Southland Regiment (1948–1964)
- 4th Otago and Southland Battalion Group (1964–2012)
