= 1st Ranger Company =

The 1st Ranger Company may refer to:

- 1st Ranger Company (New Zealand)
- 1st Ranger Infantry Company (United States)
