= Cameron Barracks =

British Army installation in Scotland

- Inverness
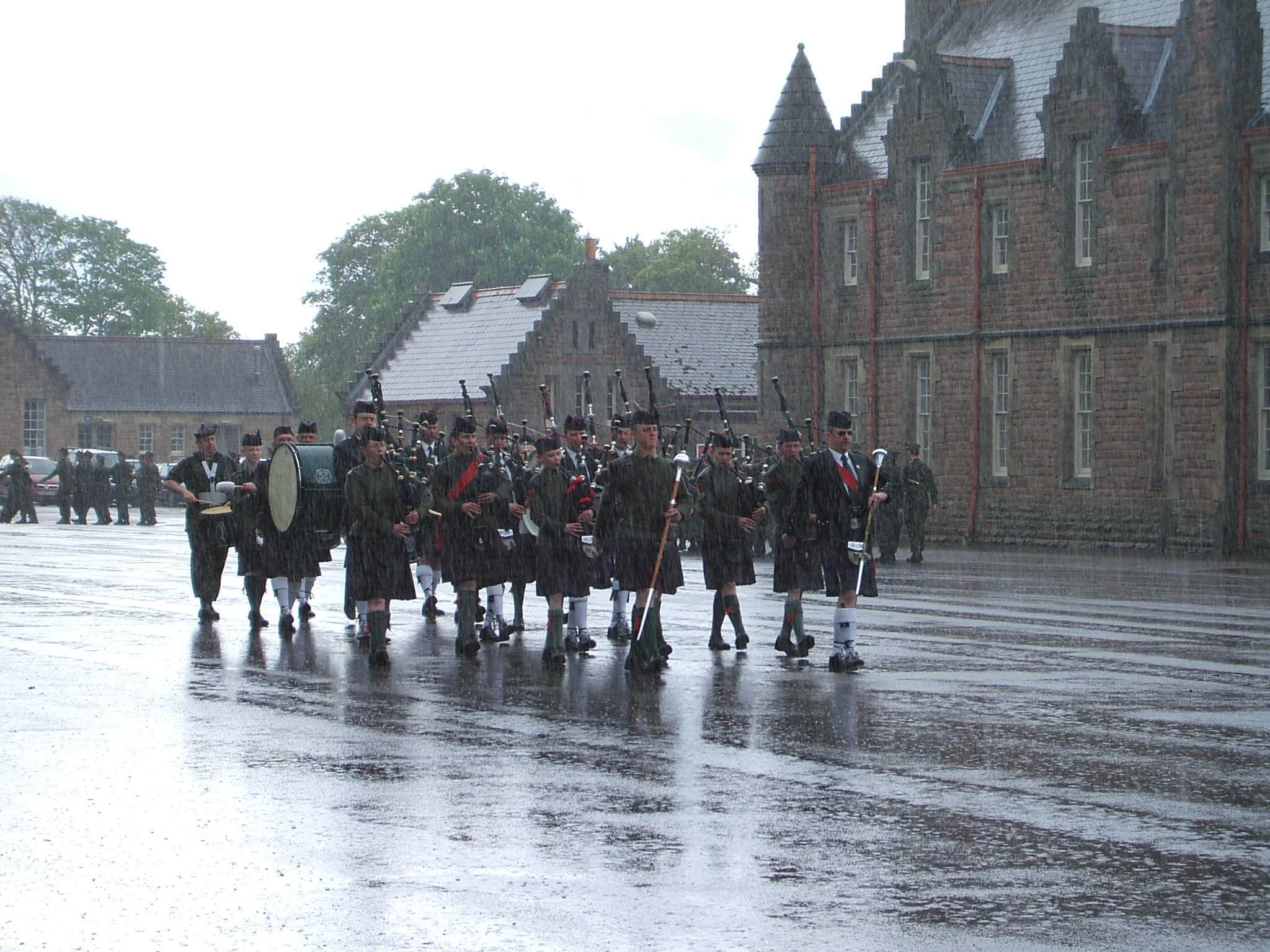
- Northern Constabulary Pipe Band at Cameron Barracks

Site information
- Type: Barracks
- Owner: Ministry of Defence
- Operator: British Army

Location
- Location within Inverness-shire
- Coordinates: 57°28′54″N 4°12′9″W

Site history
- Built: 1876–1884
- Built for: War Office
- In use: 1884–present

Cameron Barracks is a British Army installation that stands on Knockentinnel Hill on the eastern outskirts of Inverness in Scotland.

== History ==
The barracks were built by the Royal Engineers' Office between 1880 and 1886. In 1873 a system of recruiting areas based on counties had been instituted under the Cardwell Reforms and the barracks were intended to become the depot for the 71st (Highland) Regiment of Foot and the 78th (Highlanders) Regiment of Foot. Following the Childers Reforms, the barracks became the depot of the Queen's Own Cameron Highlanders in 1881.

During the First World War, the barracks was used to process many thousands of volunteer recruits. Returning wounded and demobilising soldiers also passed through the barracks towards the end of the war and on its conclusion. Conscientious objectors were, for a time, held here, as was the crew of a captured German submarine.

The barracks remained in use as the base of the Queen's Own Cameron Highlanders until September 1960, when the regiment moved to Fort George, shortly before the amalgamation of Seaforths and Camerons.

In October 2025, the UK Government announced that Cameron Barracks would be one of two military sites repurposed to provide temporary accommodation for asylum seekers and that around 900 men would be distributed between these sites. On 15 November 2025, a peaceful protest and counter-protest took place on the Inverness High Street, with no reported arrests.

== Architecture ==
Built in the Scottish baronial style, it consists of 4 two-storey blocks enclosing 3 sides of the parade ground. The north-west and west blocks each have, at their centre, twin conical-roofed drum towers linked by a balcony above the round-arched entrance. The north-east block is surmounted by an asymmetrical clock-tower. There is, at the north-east corner, a square-plan entrance tower forming the main gateway. The barracks was listed as Category B listed building on 21 May 1971.

== Music ==
Cameron Barracks has a very long affiliation with both Army Piping and Cadet Force Piping. The first Army Class of Instruction was held at Cameron Barracks in 1910 under the expert tutelage of Pipe Major John MacDonald and supervisory direction of the Piobaireachd Society. The Army Cadet Force has endeavoured to keep this affiliation alive and each year an eight-day course of instruction is held at Cameron Barracks during the Easter school holidays.

== Current units ==
The barracks are mostly used for exercising troops, however a number of small permanent occupants are present:

- Regimental Headquarters, The Highlanders, 4th Battalion, Royal Regiment of Scotland

== See also ==
- Armed forces in Scotland
- Military history of Scotland
