= 1st Ranger Company (New Zealand) =

- Active: 5 October 1987 – 1989
- Country: New Zealand
- Branch: New Zealand Army
- Type: Ranger company
- Size: 2 Platoons
- Garrison/HQ: Papakura Military Camp
- Motto(s): Te Kaha Me Te Te Nanakia
- Colors: Maroon
- Anniversaries: 5 October

Commanders
- Notable commanders: Dave Gawn

The 1st Ranger Company was a short-lived independent infantry company of the New Zealand Army. The initial training course drew all its directing staff from the New Zealand Special Air Service (NZSAS). The name 'Rangers' was chosen as a reference to Gustavus von Tempsky (1828–1868) who raised a fighting unit during the New Zealand Wars known as 'von Tempsky's Bush Rangers'. The company was raised in October 1987 and disbanded in late 1989.

== History ==
The Company was raised on 5 October 1987. A Defence White Paper had been published earlier that year that called for greater New Zealand defence self-reliance. At this time the New Zealand Special Air Service was preparing to provide high-level security for the 1990 Commonwealth Games, scheduled to be held in Auckland, New Zealand in 1990.

In October 1987 Captain Dave Gawn, Royal New Zealand Infantry Regiment, was posted in as Officer Commanding.

In early 1988 selection and training commenced. Known as the 'Basic Ranger Course', the purpose was to 'identify volunteers suitable for service with 1 Ranger Company and to develop those individuals in the basic skills required to allow them to take their place within the unit'. All directing staff were drawn from the NZSAS.

The 1st Ranger Company never reached its authorised strength, and was disbanded in late 1989 due to a reduction in the Army's funding. Many years later, in 2013, Gawn was appointed Chief of Army.

== Selections ==
There were three parts:

- Part A-Selection, 8 to 20 June 1988
- Part B-Amphibious and Cliff Assault, 4th to 31 July 1988
- Part C- Parachute Training, 1st to 31 August 1988

Throughout the Basic Ranger Course, candidates were assessed by Directing Staff in the skills of weapon handling, field craft, navigation and physical fitness. Candidates were expected to show good judgement, assimilation of tactics, physical endurance, honesty/integrity, maturity, reaction under stress and participation.

At the conclusion of parts B&C, 27 soldiers were selected to serve in 1st NZ Ranger Company. NZSAS had recently adopted the sand coloured 'ecru' beret worn by the British SAS. Soldiers within Ranger Company were 'capped' with the maroon beret, associated with airborne units. They continued to were the unit badges associated with their original units; e.g. Royal New Zealand Infantry Regiment, Royal Regiment of New Zealand Artillery.
