= Otago and Southland Regiment =

Former New Zealand infantry unit

The Otago and Southland Regiment
- Active: 1948–2012
- Country: New Zealand
- Branch: New Zealand Army
- Type: Infantry
- Garrison/HQ: Dunedin
- March: Pibroch O Donuil Dubh; The Girl I Left Behind; Invercargill
- Anniversaries: Infantry Day – 23 October

Insignia
- Tartan: MacKenzie

The Otago and Southland Regiment (1948-2012) was a Territorial Force unit of the New Zealand Army. It saw service from 1959 to 1963 during the Malayan Emergency. In 1964 the unit was renamed the 4th Otago and Southland Battalion Group. The Regiments motto was Kia Mate Toa (Fight unto Death) and Regimental Belt had the Mackenzie Tartan pattern of the Queen's Own Highlanders. The regimental badge uniquely contained a full Māori chief.

== Origin and integration ==
It was originally formed by the amalgamation of the Otago Regiment and Southland Regiment. In turn, those two regiments were the heirs of the original 4th (Otago Rifles) Regiment, 10th (North Otago) Regiment, 8th (Southland Rifles) Regiment and 14th (South Otago) Regiment formed in the early 1900s.

The regiment become a TF battalion of the Royal New Zealand Infantry Regiment in 1964 during the reorganisation of the army. This was until the later reorganisation of 1999, which saw the TF battalions split from the RNZIR to become multi-function battalion groups. The Otago and Southland Regiment became the 4th Otago and Southland Battalion Group, with the following unit types:

- Infantry – Otago Company, Southland Company, New Zealand Scottish Company (formerly unit of Royal New Zealand Armoured Corps)
- Medical – Field Surgical Team, Otago University Medical Company
- Logistics – Unit Supply Team
- Band

In December 2012 4th Otago and Southland Battalion Group merged with 2nd Canterbury (Nelson, Marlborough, West Coast) Battalion Group to form 2/4 Battalion.

- Battle Honours (the regiment perpetuates the battle honours of the 20th, 23rd, 26th, 30th and 37th Battalions, Second New Zealand Expeditionary Force)
  - South Africa 1900–1902
  - First World War: Somme 1916–1918, Messines 1917, Ypres 1917, Passchendaele, Bapaume 1918, Cambrai 1918, ANZAC, France and Flanders 1916–18, Gallipoli, Egypt 1915–16, Galatas
  - Second World War: Mount Olympus, Sidi Rezegh 1941, El Alamein, Orsogna, Tebaga Gap, Cassino 1, The Senio, Solomons
  - Second World War (awarded to NZEF Battalions): Solomons, Vella Lavella, Green Islands, South Pacific 1942–44

== Alliances ==
- United Kingdom – The Highlanders
- United Kingdom – The Duke of Lancaster's Regiment (King's Lancashire and Border)
- Australia – The Royal South Australia Regiment

== Freedoms ==
The regiment was granted the following freedoms:

- City of Oamaru (1962)
- City of Dunedin (1964)
- City of Invercargill (1969)

== See also ==
- Otago Infantry Regiment (NZEF)
- Royal New Zealand Infantry Regiment
- Malayan Emergency
- Indonesia–Malaysia confrontation
