= Wellington Regiment (City of Wellington's Own) =

The Wellington Regiment (City of Wellington's Own)
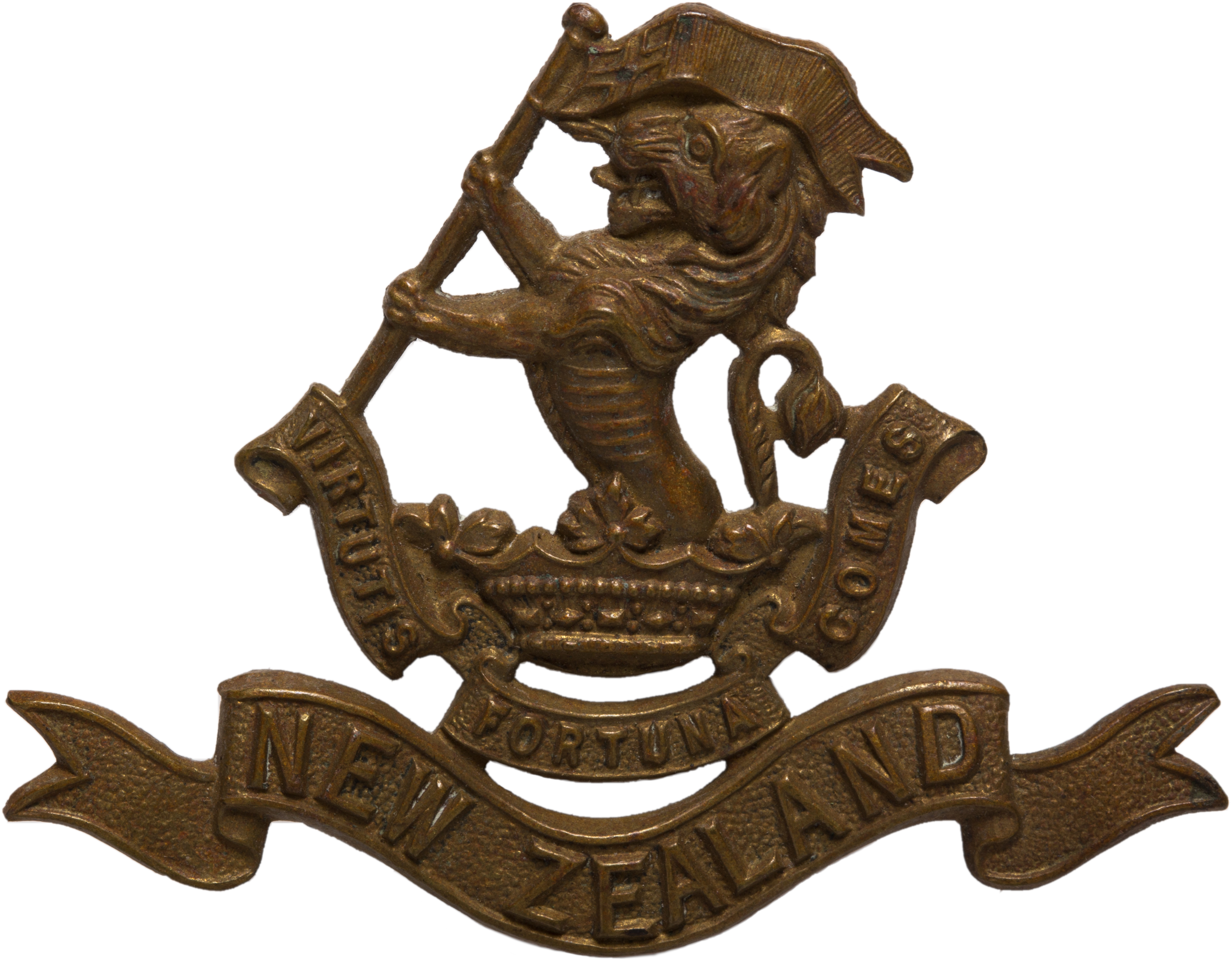
- Cap badge of the Wellington Regiment
- Active: 1867–1964
- Country: New Zealand
- Branch: New Zealand Army
- Type: Infantry
- Garrison/HQ: Wellington
- Motto(s): Virtutis Fortuna Comes (Latin: "Fortune is the companion of virtue")
- Engagements: Second Boer War; First World War; Second World War

Commanders
- Colonel-in-Chief: Queen Elizabeth II (1953-1964)

Insignia

The Wellington Regiment (City of Wellington's Own) was a territorial infantry regiment of the New Zealand Army. The regiment traced its origins to the Wellington Veteran Volunteer Corps, a volunteer corps formed in 1867 and which would later amalgamate with other volunteer corps to form the 5th (Wellington) Regiment in 1911. During the First World War, the regiment was first sent to capture German Samoa in August 1914 and was later affiliated with the New Zealand Rifle Brigade which saw combat on the Western Front. After the war, the regiment was renamed the Wellington Regiment and remained in New Zealand for home defence during the Second World War. Men from the regiment, however, served with the 19th, 22nd, 25th and 36th Battalions of the Second New Zealand Expeditionary Force. In 1964, the Wellington Regiment was amalgamated with the Hawke's Bay Regiment to become 7th Battalion (Wellington (City of Wellington's Own) and Hawke's Bay), Royal New Zealand Infantry Regiment. The 7th Battalion was itself later amalgamated with the 5th Battalion and became 5th/7th Battalion, Royal New Zealand Infantry Regiment in 2012. The traditions of the Wellington Regiment are now continued by Wellington Company, 5/7 RNZIR.

== History ==
=== 19th Century ===
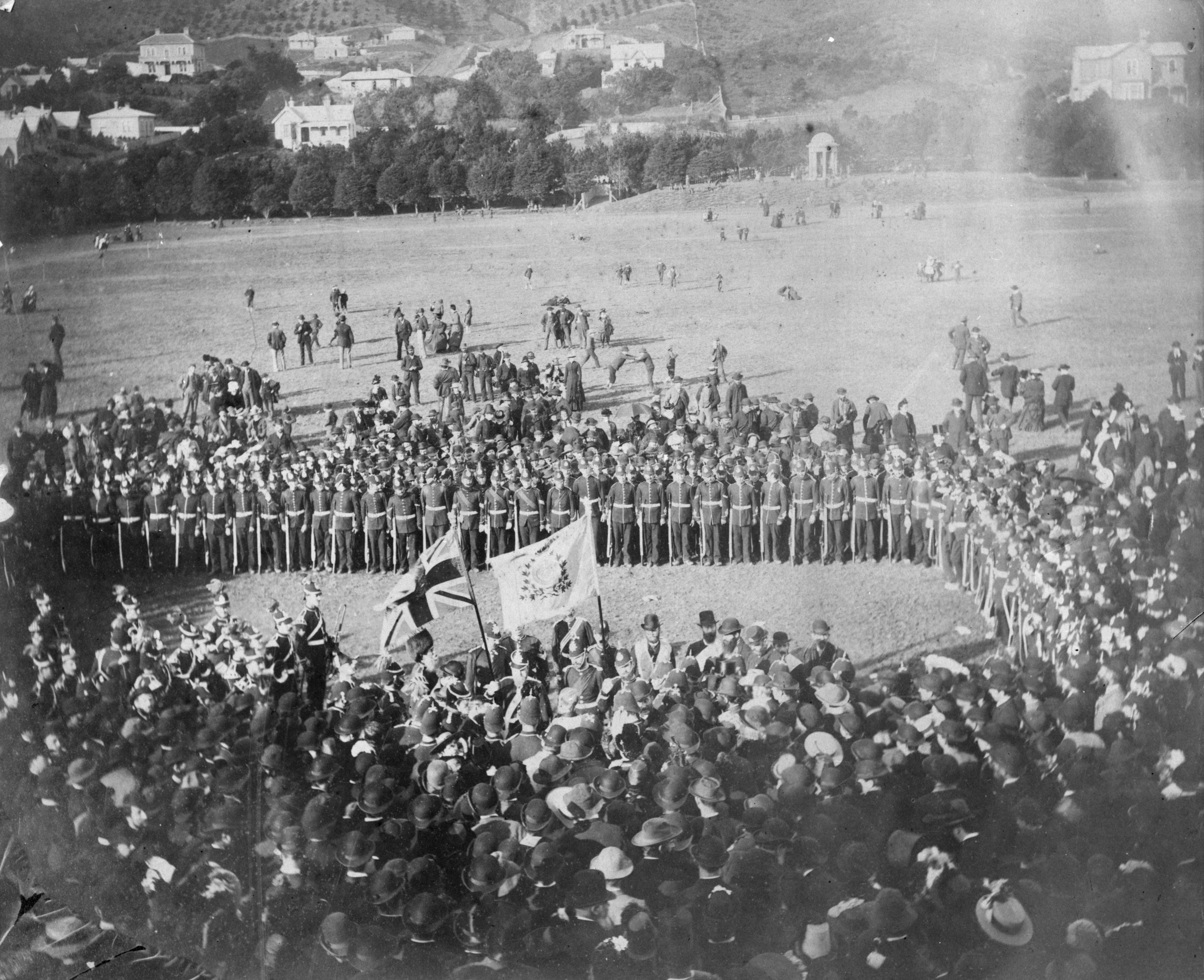
The Wellington Rifle Volunteer Battalion at the Basin Reserve, 1887

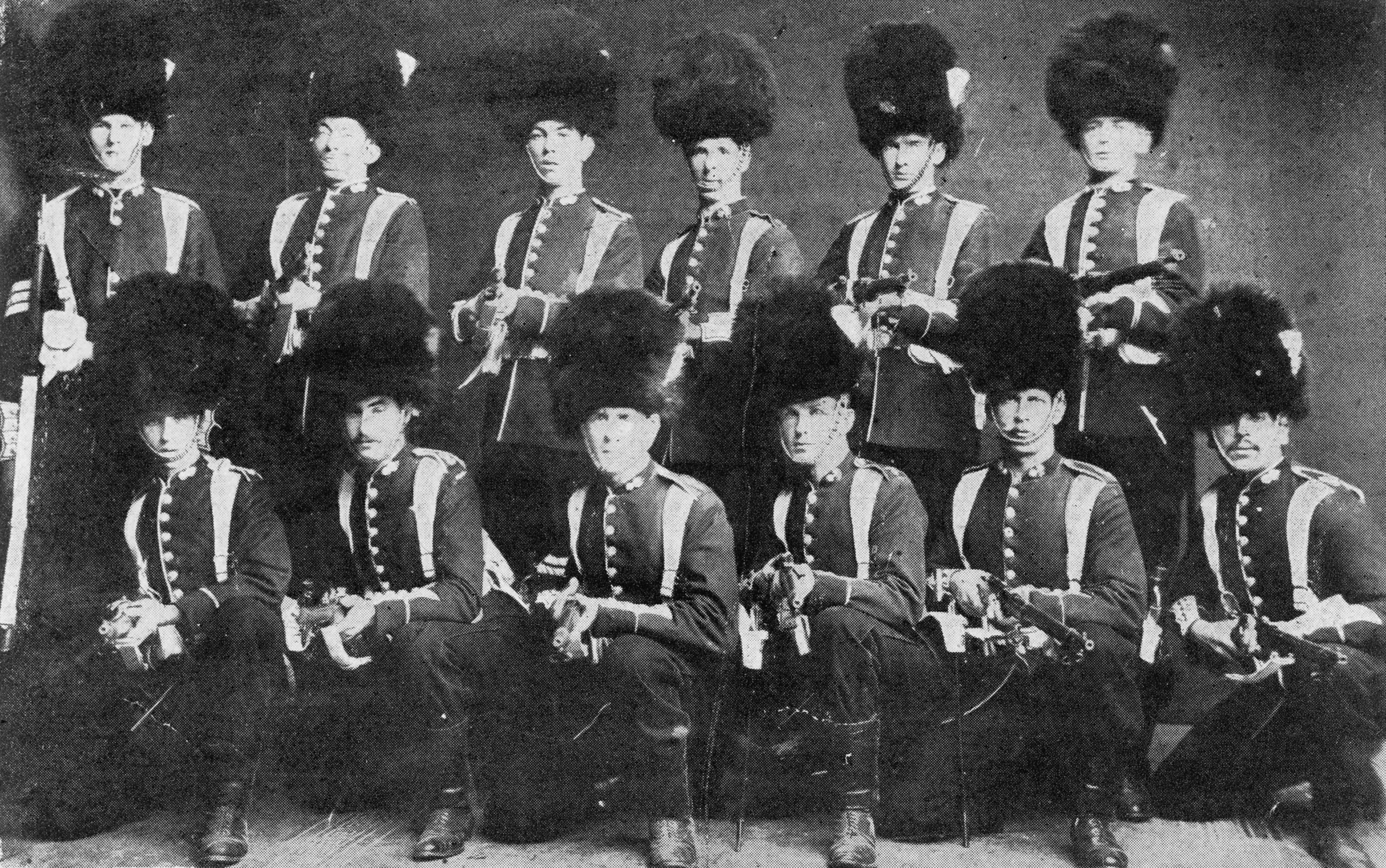
The Wellington Guards, 1900

In 1867, the Wellington Veteran Volunteer Corps was formed from former soldiers of British regiments which had served in New Zealand. The volunteers were mobilised during Tītokowaru's War in 1868 and were split into two groups: the Wellington Rifles and the Wellington Forest Rangers. Both units were involved in the raid on Te Ngutu o Te Manu on 21 August 1868 and suffered 3 men killed. The village was used as a base by Tītokowaru, however he was not captured during the raid. A further six men from the Wellington Rifles and Forest Rangers were killed during a second attack on the village on 7 September. Many of the men were disgusted by the mismanagement of the expedition and the volunteers returned to Wellington in October once their three months of service had been completed.

In order to keep up their numbers, the Wellington Veterans began to accept the sons of veterans and in 1872 changed their title to the Wellington City Rifles (commonly known as the City Rifles). In 1879, the City Rifles would be joined by another volunteer corps, the Wellington Guards, which wore the uniform of the Grenadier Guards. A further expansion of the volunteers saw four more Wellington based volunteers corps (Note: The Wellington Rifles, Newtown Rifles, Te Aro Rifles and Thorndon Rifles) formed in 1885 and all six companies were constituted into the Wellington Rifle Volunteer Battalion. The battalion was disbanded in 1888, although the City Rifles and Wellington Guards continued to exist. The battalion structure returned once again in 1895 and this time the City Rifles and Guards became part of the Wellington Battalion of Infantry Volunteers, which constituted all of the infantry volunteers of the Wellington Military district (the lower half of the North Island). They were joined by a third Wellington based corps, the Kelburn Rifles in 1895. A massive enlargement of the volunteer movement occurred in 1898 and the battalions were reorganised. The City Rifles, Wellington Guards and Kelburn Rifles joined eight newly raised volunteer corps (Note: The Civil Service Rifles, Post and Telegraph Rifles, Wellington Highland Rifles, The College Rifles, The Zealandia Rifles, Hutt Valley Rifles, Johnsonville Rifles and the Volunteer Cycle Corps) to form the 1st Battalion, Wellington Rifle Volunteers. This new battalion was formed exclusively from Wellington-based volunteer corps.

Both the City Rifles and Wellington Guards took part in the invasion of Parihaka in 1881.

During the Second Boer War (1899-1902), the New Zealand Government sent a number of mounted rifles contingents to fight in South Africa. A number of men from the Wellington Rifle Volunteers served with these contingents

In 1910, a system of compulsory military training was implemented in New Zealand and the Territorial Force replaced the Volunteer Force. Following these reforms, the 1st Battalion Wellington Rifle Volunteers became an independent regiment in 1911. Initially the battalion was redesignated as the 5th (Wellington Rifles) Regiment, however the word "Rifles" was dropped from the title in 1913 so that the regiment could be authorised to carry colours (rifle regiments do nor carry colours).

=== First World War ===
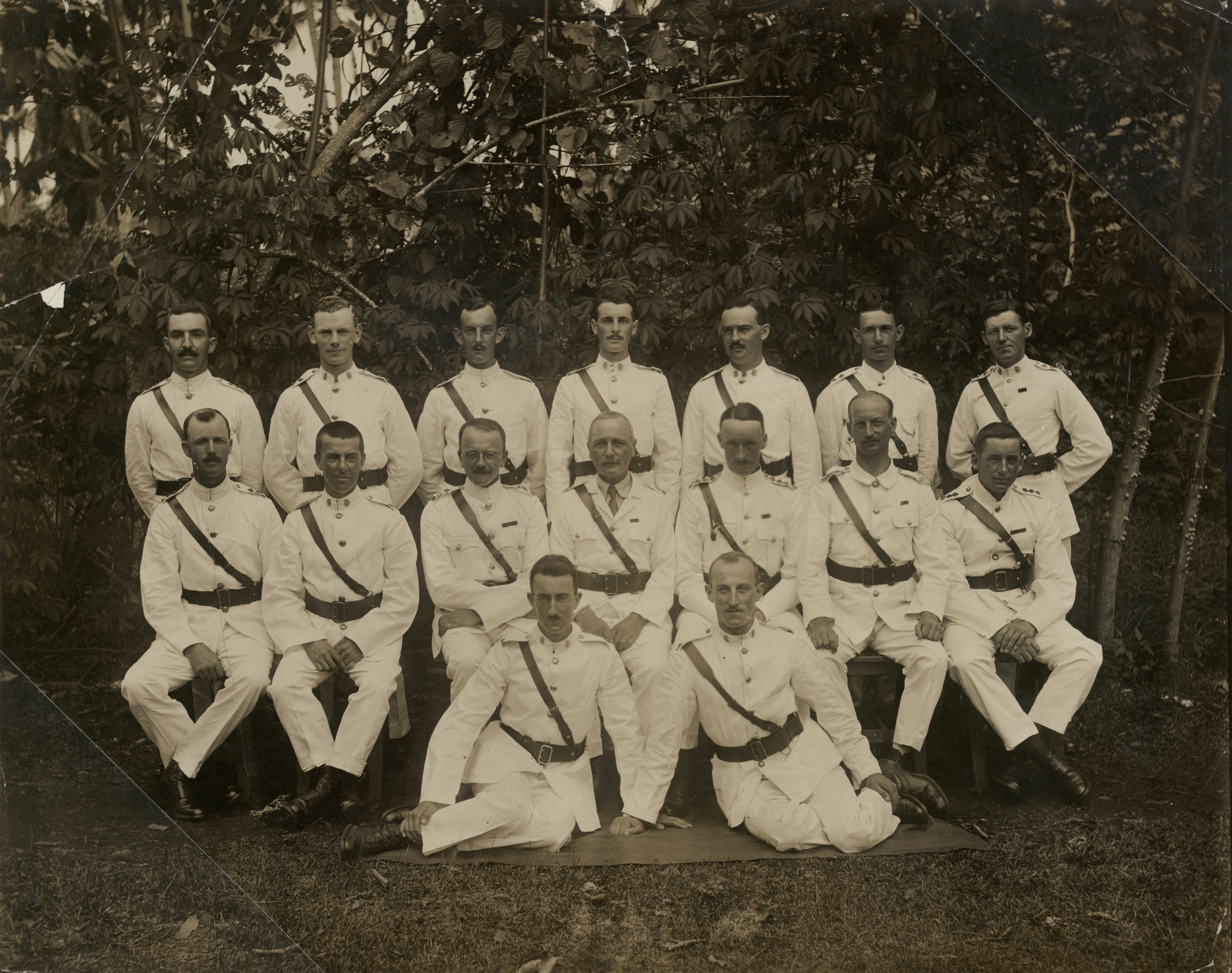
Officers of the 5th (Wellington) Regiment in Apia, c. 1914-1915

With the out break of the First World War in August 1914, the British Government requested for New Zealand to send a military force to capture the German colony of Samoa. The Samoa Expeditionary Force was dispatched on 15 August and consisted of around 1400 soldiers and nurses. The 5th (Wellington) Regiment provided two infantry companies, for a total of 559 men, which was the largest contribution of any unit in the New Zealand Military Forces. 26 men from the regimental band also travelled with the expeditionary force. Samoa was occupied without incident and the occupation force was relieved in April 1915 by a smaller force of 360 personnel who were unfit for active service.

After the Samoa expeditionary force had been despatched, the New Zealand Government decided to form an infantry brigade of four battalions from the existing territorial regiments. Each infantry battalion was made up of four companies with each company being affiliated with one of the territorial regiments. As the 5th (Wellington) Regiment was already largely overseas, it was excluded from this process. The Wellington Infantry Regiment was therefore formed from the other regiments of the Wellington Military District, namely the 7th (Wellington West Coast), 9th (Hawke's Bay) Regiment, 11th Regiment (Taranaki Rifles), and 17th (Ruahine) Regiment. Ironically the 5th (Wellington) Regiment was not affiliated with the Wellington Infantry Regiment and instead became affiliated with the New Zealand Rifle Brigade. Following the war, the Wellington Regiment inherited the black blaze insignia used by the New Zealand Rifle Brigade

The New Zealand Rifle Brigade was a newly raised regiment and unlike the other infantry regiments recruited nationally. It initially consisted of two battalions, which arrived in Egypt in November 1915 and became part of the Western Frontier Force. A third and fourth battalion joined them in March 1916 and all four battalions became the 3rd (New Zealand Rifle) Brigade of the newly formed New Zealand Division. The Regiment fought on the Western Front, engaging in the battles of the Somme, Messines, Broodseinde, Passchendaele, German Spring Offensive and the Hundred Days' Offensive. The New Zealand Rifle Brigade was disbanded at the end of the war.

=== Interbellum ===
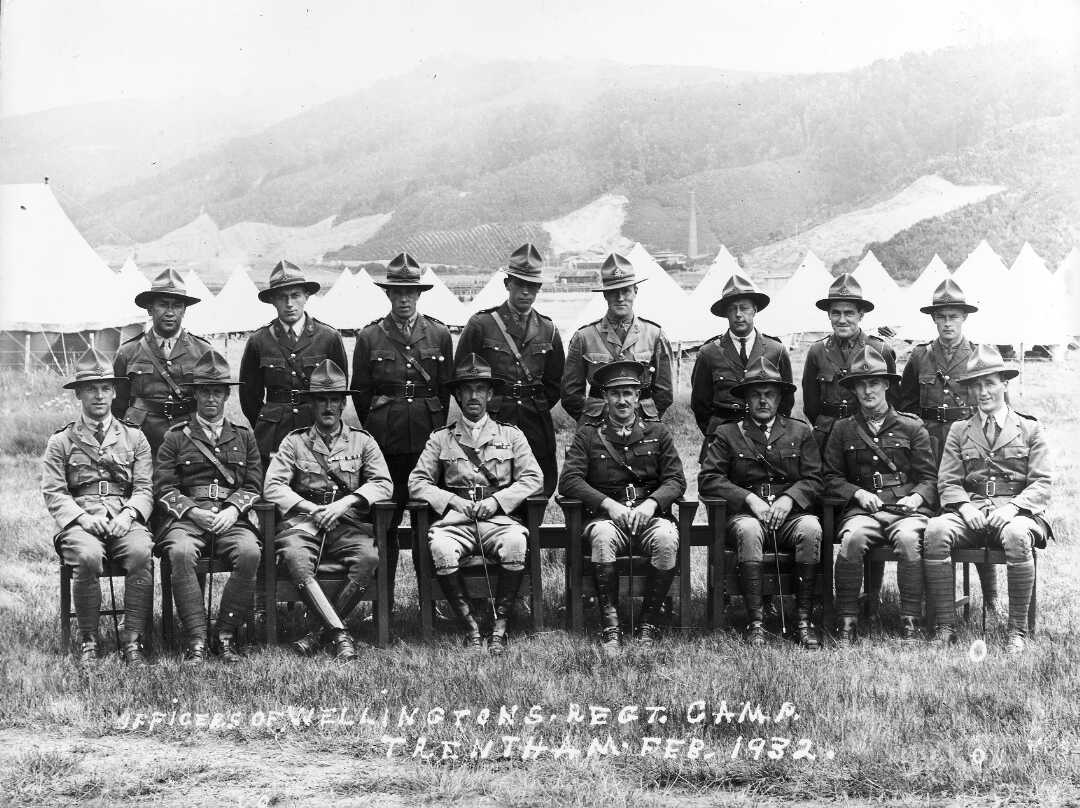
Officers of the Wellington Regiment at Trentham Military Camp, 1932

In 1921, the New Zealand territorial infantry regiments were reorganised into larger regiments, similar to those of the First World War. The 5th (Wellington) Regiment was redesignated as 1st Battalion, Wellington Regiment, while the 7th (Wellington west Coast), 9th (Wellington East Coast) and 11th (Taranaki Rifles) regiments became the 2nd, 3rd and 4th battalions, respectively. The amalgamation was short lived and in 1923 the 2nd, 3rd and 4th battalions reverted to being independent regiments.

In 1938, the Wellington Regiment endeavoured to establish a stronger link between the regiment and the city of Wellington. The regiment changed its name to the Wellington Regiment (City of Wellington's Own) and was granted the freedom of the city of Wellington, which gave it the right to march "with swords drawn, colours flying and bayonets fixed" through the city. The Wellington Regiment was the first New Zealand regiment to receive such an honour.

=== Second World War ===
The Wellington Regiment remained in New Zealand for home defence during the Second World War and raised a 2nd battalion in November 1940. A 3rd and 4th Battalion were also formed in February 1942 by redesignating the former 2nd and 11th Battalions of the National Military Reserve, respectively. The 1st, 3rd and 4th Battalions were stationary fortress troops, intended to defend Wellington from Japanese attack, while the 2nd Battalion was intended to have a mobile reactive role as part of the 7th Brigade Group, 4th Division. By June 1943, the war in the pacific was looking favourable for the Allies and a general stand-down was ordered in New Zealand. The wartime battalions, however, were not formally disbanded until April 1944.

Men from the Wellington Regiment saw combat with the battalions associated with the Central Military District. The 19th, 22nd and 25th battalions each had a company designated as A (Wellington) Company, which was affiliated with the Wellington Regiment. These battalions formed part of the 2nd New Zealand Division and saw action in Greece, Crete, North Africa, Tunisia and Italy. The Wellington Regiment also supplied men to the 36th Battalion of the 3rd New Zealand Division, which saw combat at the Treasury Islands.

=== Post War ===
As part of the 1953 Coronation Honours, Queen Elizabeth II was appointed as Colonel-in-Chief of the regiment. During the Royal visit of New Zealand in 1953/54, the Wellington Regiment was granted the unique privilege of mounting the full Military Guard of Honour at the 1954 State Opening of Parliament. The 1954 opening was the first time the New Zealand Parliament had been opened by a reigning monarch and the Wellington Regiment were inspected by the Queen.

A reorganisation of the territorial force in 1961 saw the number of infantry battalions reduced from nine to six. To avoid the disbandment of any regiments, three regiments, including the Wellington Regiment, became "recessed". The recessed regiments would not raise a battalion and only consist of a regimental headquarters, a band and two rifle companies. The two companies would wear the cap badge of the recessed regiment, but be operationally part of a battalion of one of the non-recessed regiments. The Wellington Regiment therefore formed two rifle companies which were A company of the Wellington West Coast and Taranaki Regiment and D company of the Hawke's Bay Regiment.

In 1964 the territorial regiments were merged into the Royal New Zealand Infantry Regiment. The Wellington Regiment was amalgamated with the Hawke's Bay Regiment and became 7th Battalion (Wellington (City of Wellington's Own) and Hawke's Bay), Royal New Zealand Infantry Regiment. The 7th Battalion was itself later amalgamated with the 5th Battalion and became 5th/7th Battalion, Royal New Zealand Infantry Regiment in 2012. Wellington Company, 5/7 RNZIR now continues the traditions of the Wellington Regiment.

== Battle Honours and Colours ==
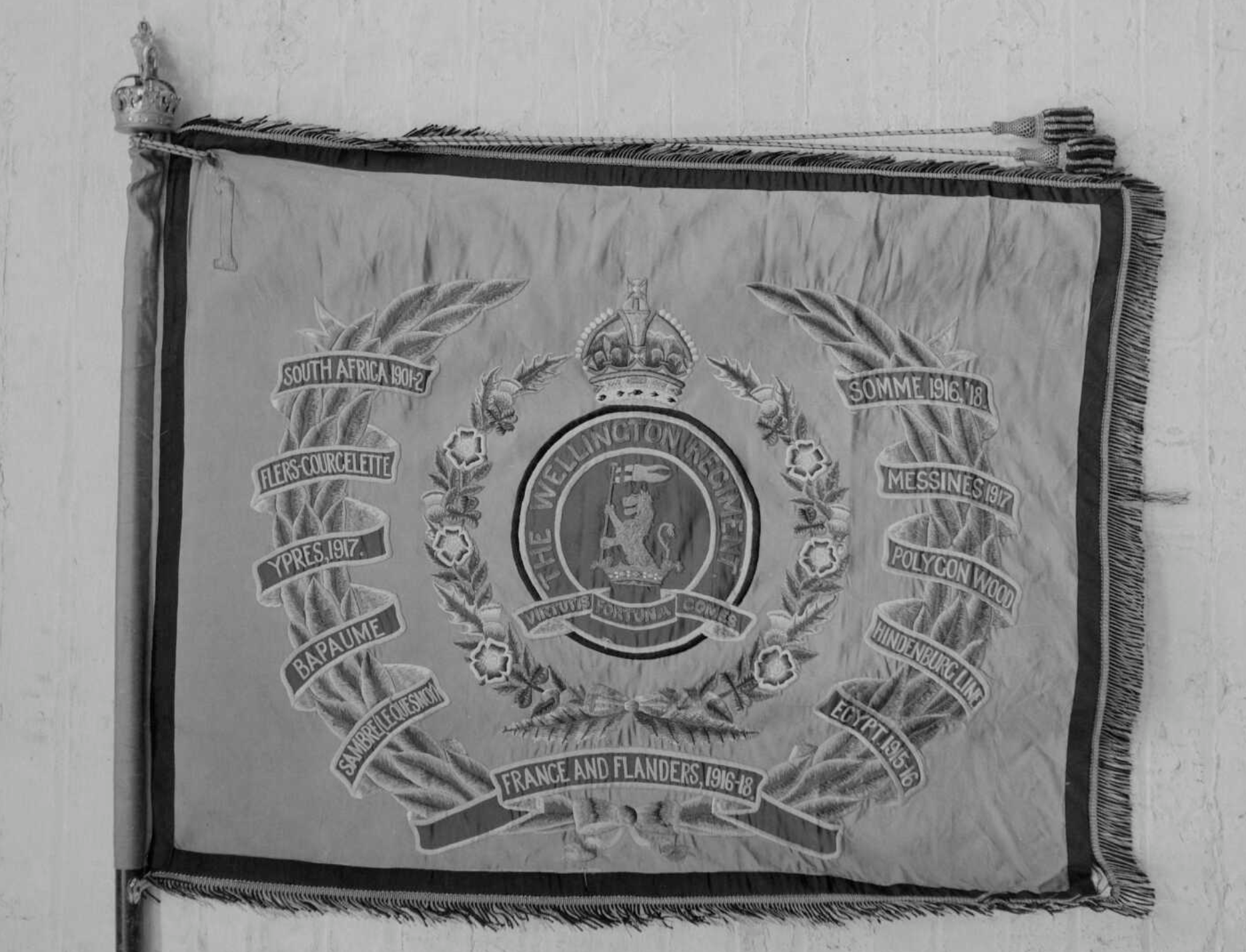
Regimental colour (1929) of the Wellington Regiment

The Wellington Rifle Battalion received a stand of colours in 1887 and were used until 1929 when they were finally laid up in St Paul's Pro-Cathedral. The second stand of colours were presented to the Wellington Regiment in the same year. These colours continued to be used after the regiments amalgamation in 1964, with 7th Battalion parading both the colours of the Wellington Regiment and the Hawkes Bay Regiment until they too were laid up in Wellington Cathedral of St Paul in 1979.

The Wellington Regiment were awarded the following battle honours:

- Second Boer War: South Africa 1899–1902
- First World War: Egypt 1915–16, France and Flanders 1916–1918, Somme 1916, Flers-Courcelette, Messines 1917, Ypres 1917, Polygon Wood, Bapaume 1918, Hindenburg Line, Sambre
- Second World War: Greece, Crete, Belhamed, Minqar Qaim, El Alamein, Enfidaville, The Sangro, Cassino 1, The Senio, The Treasury Islands

== Alliances ==
- United Kingdom – The York and Lancaster Regiment (1913–1964)
- United Kingdom – Seaforth Highlanders (1950–1961)

== Notes ==
Footnotes

Citations
