= Highlanders (Seaforth, Gordons and Camerons) =

The Highlanders, 4th Battalion, Royal Regiment of Scotland
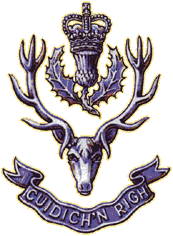
- Former cap badge of the Highlanders
- Active: 17 September 1994 – present
- Country: United Kingdom
- Branch: British Army
- Type: Infantry
- Role: Mechanized Infantry
- Size: Battalion; 743 personnel
- Part of: 20th Armoured Infantry Brigade
- Garrison/HQ: RHQ – Cameron Barracks; Battalion – Catterick Garrison
- Motto: Cuidich 'n Righ (Help the King)
- March: Quick: Wee Highland Laddie

Insignia
- Tactical Recognition Flash
- Tartan: Gordon (kilt); Seaforth Mackenzie (trews); Cameron of Erracht (pipers and drummers kilts)
- Hackle: Blue; From Queens Own Cameron Highlanders/Queen's Own Highlanders (Seaforth and Camerons)

The Highlanders, 4th Battalion, Royal Regiment of Scotland (4 SCOTS) is an infantry battalion of the Royal Regiment of Scotland.

Prior to 28 March 2006, the Highlanders was an infantry regiment in its own right; The Highlanders (Seaforth, Gordons and Camerons), part of the Scottish Division. The regiment was one of only two in the British Army with a Gaelic motto – Cuidich 'n Righ which means "Help the King". (The other is the Royal Irish Regiment.)

== History ==
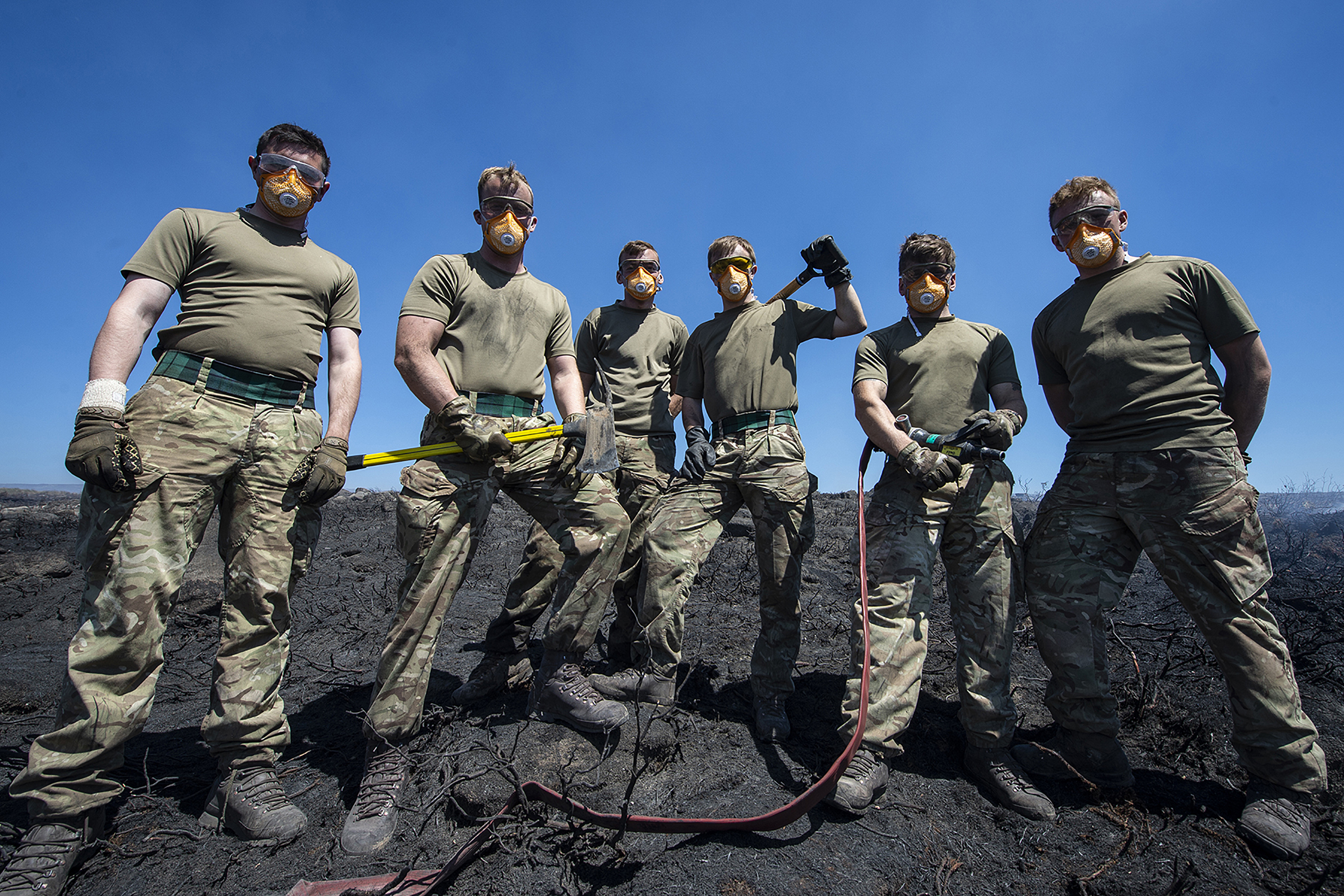
Members of the battalion on Saddleworth Moor during the 2018 United Kingdom wildfires.

The regiment was formed on 17 September 1994 as part of the Options for Change defence review, by the amalgamation of the Queen's Own Highlanders (Seaforth and Camerons) and the Gordon Highlanders.

The new regiment undertook a two-year tour of Northern Ireland from April 1995, and were stationed at Ebrington Barracks in County Londonderry. After being based in various locations around the United Kingdom, the battalion was deployed to Bosnia in 2003.

In 2004, as part of the restructuring of the infantry, it was announced that The Highlanders would be amalgamated with the other Scottish infantry regiments into the single large Royal Regiment of Scotland. The amalgamation took place on 28 March 2006. As with the other Scottish regiments, the Highlanders were permitted to retain their former name as the new battalion's primary title, with the battalion number as a subtitle. They therefore became The Highlanders, 4th Battalion, The Royal Regiment of Scotland.

Prior to amalgamation, the battalion moved to the Bergen-Hohne Garrison, Bad Fallingbostel, in Germany, as part of 7 Armoured Brigade, the descendants of the Second World War's Desert Rats, equipped with the Warrior Infantry Vehicle. From here they undertook six-month tours of Iraq in 2005–06 and 2008, and Afghanistan in April 2011.

In September 2015 the battalion moved from Germany to Bourlon Barracks in Catterick Garrison, where they became a heavy protected-mobility battalion forming part of 20th Armoured Infantry Brigade.

As a result of Army 2020 Refine restructure, the battalion joined the Strike Experimentation Group in 2020.

== Uniform and traditions ==
While the 4 SCOTS now wear the Government 1A pattern tartan, prior to amalgamation in 2006 the regiment wore the Gordon tartan when in kilts and the Seaforth Mackenzie when in trews. The battalion's pipers and drummers wear kilts in the Cameron of Erracht tartan. The battalion recruits from the Hebrides, the Northern Isles, the mainland counties of Inverness-shire, Ross and Cromarty, Sutherland, Caithness, Moray and Nairnshire, and from the traditional Gordon heartlands in Aberdeen and Aberdeenshire. The Battalion Headquarters is located at Cameron Barracks in Inverness.

The battalion is the mainstay of the British Army's only shinty team, The Scots Shinty Club. Due to the 4th Battalion's regular placements abroad, the team only plays in cup matches.

== Colonel-in-Chief ==
- 1994–2006: Field Marshal The Duke of Rothesay
- 2006–2021: Field Marshal The Duke of Edinburgh
- 2022–present: King Charles III

== Regimental colonels ==
Regimental colonels were:

- 1994–2001: Gen. Sir John Jeremy George Mackenzie
- 2001–2006: Brig. Hugh Brisbane Henry Ewart Monro
- 2006: Regiment amalgamated with The Royal Scots, The Royal Highland Fusiliers, The King's Own Scottish Borderers, The Black Watch and The Argyll and Sutherland Highlanders to form The Royal Regiment of Scotland

== Alliances ==
- Canada - The Cameron Highlanders of Ottawa (Duke of Edinburgh's Own)
- Canada - The 48th Highlanders of Canada
- Canada - The Queen's Own Cameron Highlanders of Canada
- Canada - The Seaforth Highlanders of Canada
- Canada - The Toronto Scottish Regiment (Queen Elizabeth The Queen Mother's Own)
- Australia - 10th/27th Bn, Royal South Australia Regiment
- Australia - 5th/6th Battalion, Royal Victoria Regiment via The Victorian Scottish Regiment
- Australia - 7th Battalion, The Royal Australian Regiment
- Australia - The Royal South Australia Regiment
- Australia - 16th Battalion, The Royal Western Australia Regiment - Formally the 16th Battalion, The Cameron Highlanders of Western Australia
- New Zealand - The Otago and Southland Regiment
- New Zealand - The Wellington (City of Wellington's Own) and Hawke's Bay Regiment
- South Africa - Cape Town Highlanders
- Royal Navy - HMS Sutherland
- Royal Navy - HMS Victorious

== Lineage ==
Lineage
The Highlanders (Seaforth, Gordons and Camerons)	The Queen's Own Highlanders (Seaforth and Camerons)	The Queen's Own Cameron Highlanders	
The Highlanders (Seaforth, Gordons and Camerons)	The Queen's Own Highlanders (Seaforth and Camerons)	The Seaforth Highlanders (Ross-shire Buffs, The Duke of Albany's)	The 72nd (Duke of Albany's Own) Highlanders
The Highlanders (Seaforth, Gordons and Camerons)	The Queen's Own Highlanders (Seaforth and Camerons)	The Seaforth Highlanders (Ross-shire Buffs, The Duke of Albany's)	The 78th Highlanders (Ross-shire Buffs)
The Highlanders (Seaforth, Gordons and Camerons)	The Gordon Highlanders	The 75th (Stirlingshire) Regiment of Foot	
The Highlanders (Seaforth, Gordons and Camerons)	The Gordon Highlanders	The 92nd (Gordon Highlanders) Regiment of Foot	

== See also ==
- Armed forces in Scotland
- Military history of Scotland
