= Wellington West Coast Regiment =

- Active: 1860-1948
- Country: New Zealand
- Branch: New Zealand Military Forces
- Type: Infantry
- Motto: Acer in Armis (Latin: Strong in arms)
- Engagements: Second Boer War; First World War; Second World War

The Wellington West Coast Regiment was a territorial infantry regiment of the New Zealand Military Forces. The regiment traced its origins to the Wanganui Rifle Volunteers, a volunteer corps formed in 1860. The volunteer corps provided men to the New Zealand contingents sent to South Africa during the Second Boer War and in 1911 became the 7th (Wellington West Coast) Regiment. During the First World War, the regiment provided a company to each of the battalions of the Wellington Infantry Regiment, which saw combat at Galipolli and on the Western Front. After the war the regiment was renamed the Wellington West Coast Regiment and remained in New Zealand for home defence during the Second World War. Men from the regiment, however, served with the 19th, 22nd, 25th and 36th Battalions of the Second New Zealand Expeditionary Force. In 1948, the Wellington West Coast Regiment was amalgamated with the Taranaki Regiment and became the Wellington West Coast and Taranaki Regiment.

== History ==
=== Volunteer Period ===
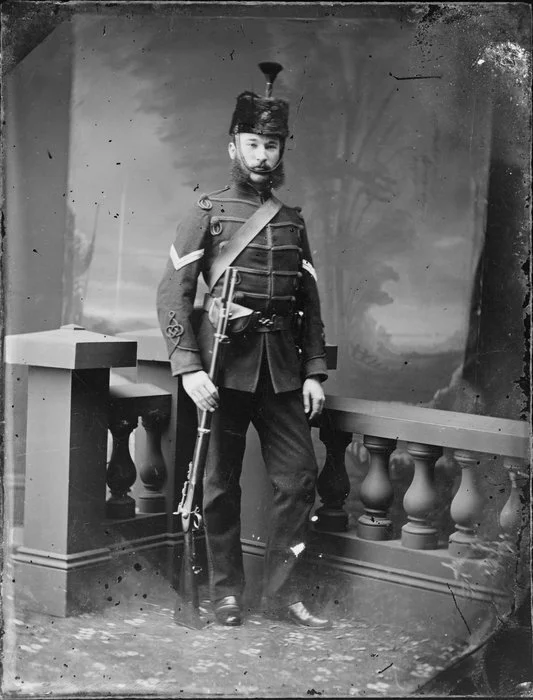
Soldier of the Wanganui Rifle Volunteers, c. 1870s

The No. 1 company of the Wanganui Rifle Volunteers was formed on 2 July 1860 and the no.2 company was formed the following day. The difference in formation date lead to arguments about seniority and in attempt the to partially resolve the issue the numerical designations were removed. The no.1 and No.2 companies were then retitled as the Victoria (after Queen Victoria) and Grey (after Governor Grey) companies respectively. The Colonial Defence Act 1862 required all volunteer units to disband and re-enlist. The minimum enlistment of 40 men per company could not be achieved and so men from the Grey company were merged into the Victoria Company. Over the course of the 1860s 14 different rifle corps were formed in the Wellington West coast Region; nine in the Wanganui District and five in the Rangitikei District. Most of these were short lived and were soon disbanded. The Victoria Company was disbanded in 1870, Although the Wanganui Rifle Volunteers were reformed that same year. The longest continuously serving corps was the Royal Rangitikei Rifle Volunteers, which was formed in 1865 and would ultimately become part of the future 7th Regiment.

In 1886 the Wanganui Rifles, Royal Rangitikei Rifles along and numerous other volunteers corps, were formed into the West Coast (North Island) Battalion of Rifle Volunteers. The battalion and some of its constituent volunteer corps were disbanded in 1889. The battalion organisation returned in 1898, but was titled 2nd Battalion Wellington (West Coast) Rifle Volunteers. Men from Wellington West Coast Battalion served in South Africa during the Second Boer War as part of the New Zealand Mounted Rifles Contingents. The Battalion was subsequently awarded the battle honour "South Africa 1900-1902".

The Defence Act 1909 introduced a system of compulsory military training and replaced the Volunteer Force with the Territorial Force. As part of the reform, the 2nd Battalion Wellington (West Coast) Rifle Volunteers was redesignated as the 7th Regiment (Wellington West Coast Rifles). In 1913 the word "Rifles" was dropped from the title so that the Regiment could be authorised to carry colours (rifle regiments do not carry colours). The regiment was then known as the 7th (Wellington West Coast) Regiment.

=== First World War ===
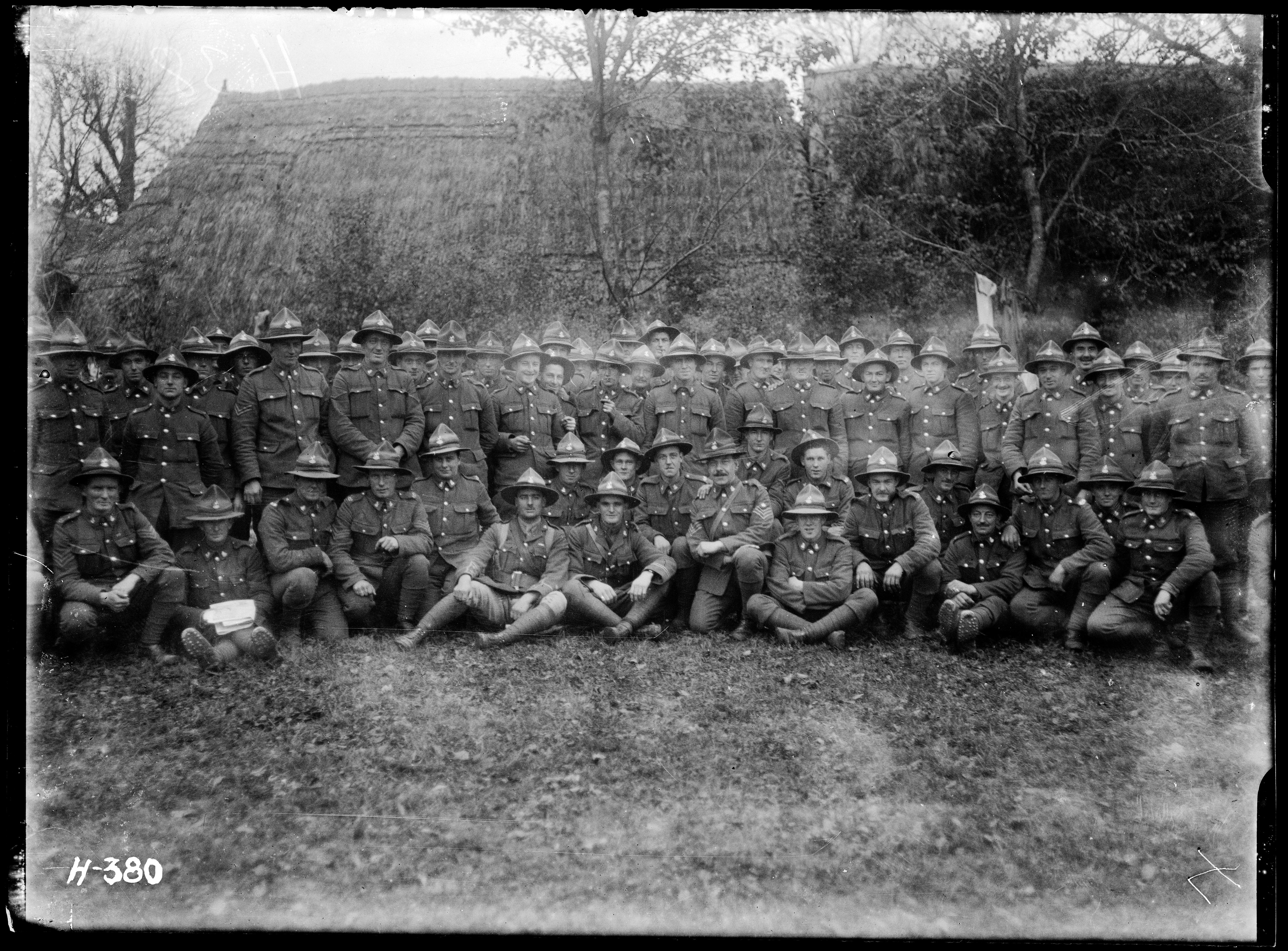
Men from one of the Wellington West Coast companies in France, 1917

At the outbreak of the First World War in August 1914, the decision was made to form a New Zealand infantry brigade of four battalions from the existing territorial regiments. Men from the 7th (Wellington West Coast) Regiment formed the 7th (Wellington West Coast) Company of the Wellington Battalion, which saw service during the Gallipoli Campaign. Following the evacuation from Gallipoli in 1916, the Battalion was expanded to a regiment of two battalions. The Wellington Infantry Regiment would see action on the western front, engaging in the battles of the Somme, Messines, Passchendaele, German Spring Offensive and the Hundred Days' Offensive. A third battalion was also raised in 1917, but was disbanded in 1918 due to manpower shortages. Both the 2nd and 3rd battalions were organised along the same lines as the 1st Battalion, each with their own 7th (Wellington West Coast) Company. The Wellington Infantry Regiment was disbanded at the end of the war.

=== Interbellum ===
In 1921, the New Zealand territorial regiments were reorganised into larger regiments, similar to those of the First World War, with the 7th (Wellington West Coast) Regiment becoming the 4th Battalion, Wellington Regiment. The amalgamations were short lived and in 1923, the previous organisation was reverted to, although the ordinals were dropped and the regiment became the Wellington West Coast Regiment.

A similar organisation occurred in 1937. The Wellington West Coast Regiment was reduced to a depot and supplied a single rifle company to the 2nd Composite Battalion. The new Battalion also had rifle companies from the Taranaki and Hawke's Bay regiments. The composite system was abandoned in May 1939, just prior to the outbreak of war and the territorial regiments were brought up to their war establishment.

=== Second World War ===
During the Second World War, the Wellington West Coast Regiment remained in New Zealand for home defence. A second and third battalion were formed in 1942 by redesignating the 13th and 18th Battalions of the National Military Reserve, respectively. The 2nd and 3rd Battalions were independent and intended to defend Whanganui and Palmerston North, respectively. The 1st Battalion became part of 2nd Infantry Brigade, 4th Division, and was expected to provide a mobile response to any invasion throughout the country. The territorial forces were stood down in June 1943 and the 2nd Battalion was formally disbanded in April 1944.

Men from the regiment saw active service overseas with the 19th, 22nd, 25th and 36th battalions of the 2nd New Zealand Expeditionary Force. A Wellington West Coast Company was formed in each of the 19th, 22nd and 25th battalions, similar to the Wellington Regiment of the First World War. These battalions formed part of the 2nd New Zealand Division and saw action in Greece, Crete, North Africa, Tunisia and Italy. The 36th Battalion, was deployed to the Pacific with the 3rd New Zealand Division and saw combat at the Treasury Islands.

=== Amalgamation ===
The Wellington West Coast Regiment was amalgamated with the Taranaki Regiment in 1948 and became the Wellington West Coast and Taranaki Regiment.

== Battle Honours ==
The Wellington West Coast Regiment was awarded the following battle honours:

- New Zealand Wars: New Zealand*
- Boer War: South Africa 1900-1902*
- First World War: Somme 1916,18, Flers-Courcelette, Morval, Le Transloy, Messines 1917, Ypres 1917, Polygon Wood, Broodseinde, Passendale, Arras 1918, Ancre 1918, Albert 1918, Bapaume 1918, Hindenburg Line, Havrincourt, Canal du Nord, Cambrai 1918, Selle, Sambre, France and Flanders 1916–1918, Helles, Krithia, Anzac, Landing at Anzac, Defence of Anzac, Hill 60 (ANZAC), Sari Bair, Gallipolli 1915, Suez Canal, Egypt 1915-16

The Wellington West Coast Regiment did not receive any battle honours during the Second World War. However, in 1958, the regiment's descendant unit, the Wellington West Coast and Taranaki Regiment, inherited the battle honours of the 19th, 22nd, 25th and 36th battalions with which men from the Wellington West Coast Regiment served.

== Alliances ==
- United Kingdom – Royal Irish Regiment (1913–1922)
- United Kingdom – Royal Hampshire Regiment (1925-1948)
