= Hawke's Bay Regiment =

The Hawke's Bay Regiment
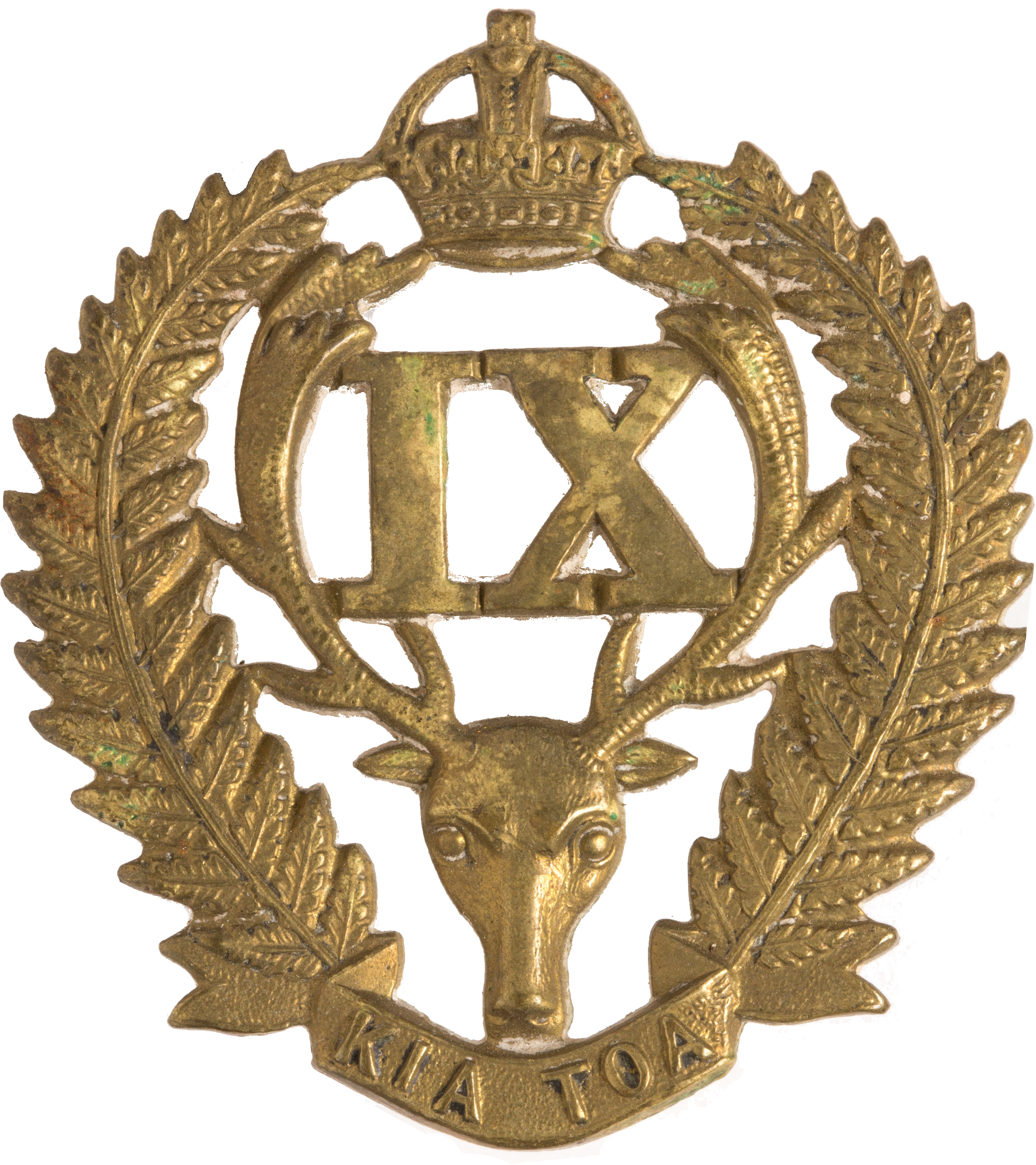
- Cap badge of the Hawke's Bay Regiment
- Active: 1863–1964
- Country: New Zealand
- Branch: New Zealand Army
- Type: Infantry
- Garrison/HQ: Napier
- Motto: Kia toa (Māori: "be brave")
- Engagements: Second Boer War; First World War; Second World War

Commanders
- Colonel-in-Chief: The Duke of Edinburgh
- Notable commanders: Richard Harrison

The Hawke's Bay Regiment was a territorial infantry regiment of the New Zealand Military Forces. The regiment traced its origins to the Napier Rifle Volunteer Rifles, a volunteer corps formed in 1863 and which would later amalgamate with other volunteer corps to form the 9th (Hawkes Bay) Regiment in 1911. During the First World War, the regiment provided a company to each of the battalions of the Wellington Infantry Regiment and saw combat at Galipolli and on the Western Front. After the war the regiment was renamed the Hawke's Bay Regiment and remained in New Zealand for home defense during the Second World War. Men from the regiment, however, served with the 19th, 22nd, 25th and 36th Battalions of the Second New Zealand Expeditionary Force. The regiment had a close relationship with the Ruahine Regiment, which was detached and reabsorbed by the Hawke's Bay regiment on two separate occasions. In 1964, the Hawkes Bay regiment was amalgamated with the Wellington Regiment and become the 7th Battalion (Wellington (City of Wellington's Own) and Hawke's Bay), Royal New Zealand Infantry Regiment

== History ==
=== 19th Century ===
The Hawke's Bay Regiment can trace its origins to the Napier Rifle Volunteers, a volunteer corps which was formed on 1 July 1863. The volunteers were involved in the East Cape War, fighting against the Hauhau in 1865 and 1866, and were also called up in 1869 during Te Kooti's War.

The Napier Rifle Volunteers were disbanded in 1874, but were reformed in 1879 when the Napier Engineers, which had been raised the year earlier, were converted into infantry. The Napier Rifles became part of the Wellington Battalion of Infantry volunteers in 1895, but were transferred to the newly formed 3rd Battalion Wellington (East Coast) Rifle Volunteers in 1898, which brought together multiple corps from the Hawke's Bay region. (Note: The companies of the battalion were the Napier Guards, Napier Rifles, Hastings Rifles, Woodville Rifles, Waipawa Rifles and Dannevirke Rifles (A through F companies respectively). The Napier Guards, was originally formed as F Battery, New Zealand Artillery in 1869, but converted to Infantry in 1897.)

During the Second Boer War (1899-1902), the New Zealand Government sent a number of mounted rifles contingents to fight in South Africa. A number of men from the 3rd Battalion served with these contingents

In 1910, New Zealand instigated a system of compulsory military training which replaced the Volunteer Force with the Territorial Force. The next year, the 3rd Battalion (Wellington East Coast) amalgamated with the 5th Battalion (Centre or Ruahine) and became an independent regiment titled the 9th Regiment (Wellington East Coast Rifles), although the word "rifles" was dropped from the title in 1913. Initially the regiment consisted of only a single battalion, but a second battalion was soon raised in 1912. The 1st Battalion was based in Napier and the 2nd in Masterton, effectively the same organisation as the former 3rd and 5th volunteer battalions. The 9th Regiment was the only regiment in the New Zealand Military Forces to have more than one battalion. The 2nd Battalion, however, was detached in March 1914 and became its own regiment, the 17th (Ruahine) Regiment. The recruiting area of the 9th Regiment was shrunk to only include Hawke's Bay and so the regiment was subsequently redesignated as the 9th (Hawke's Bay) Regiment.

=== First World War ===
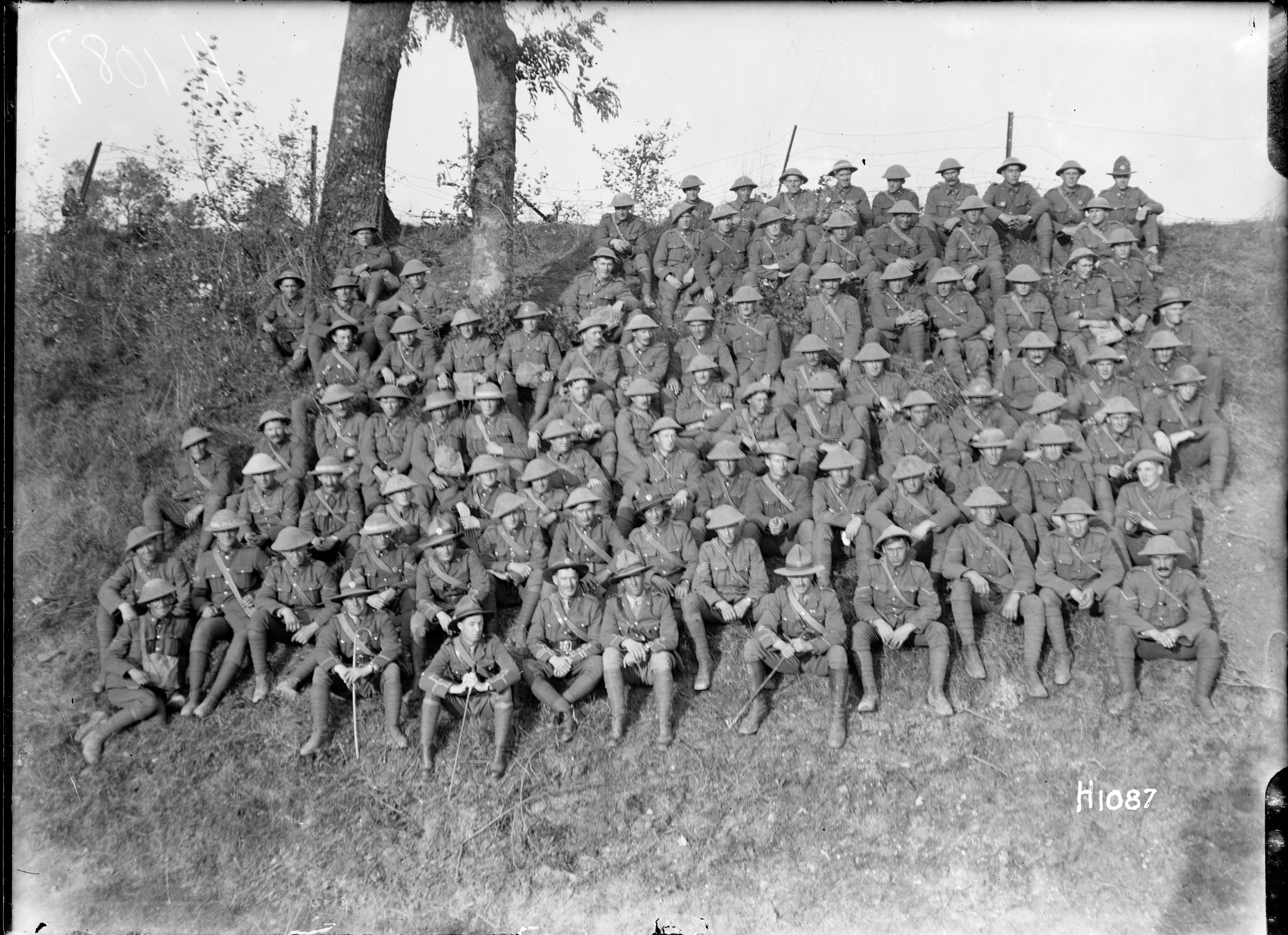
One of the 9th (Hawke's Bay) companies of the Wellington Infantry Regiment in France during World War I

At the outbreak of war in August 1914, the decision was made to form a New Zealand infantry brigade of four battalions from the existing territorial regiments. Men from the 9th (Hawke's Bay) Regiment formed the 9th (Hawke's Bay) Company of the Wellington Battalion, which saw service during the Gallipoli Campaign. Following the evacuation from Gallipoli in 1916, the Battalion became a regiment of two battalions. The Wellington Regiment would see action on the western front, engaging in the battles of the Somme, Messines, Broodseinde, Passchendaele, German Spring Offensive and the Hundred Days' Offensive. A third battalion was also raised in 1917, but was disbanded in 1918 due to manpower shortages. Both the 2nd and 3rd battalions were organised along the same lines as the 1st Battalion, each with their own eponymous 9th (Hawke's Bay) Company. The Wellington Regiment was disbanded at the end of the war.

=== Interbellum ===
In 1921, the New Zealand territorial infantry regiments were reorganised into larger regiments, similar to those of the First World War. The 9th (Hawke's Bay) Regiment reabsorbed the 17th (Ruahine Regiment) and was redesignated as 3rd Battalion, Wellington Regiment. The reorganisation was short lived and in 1923, the battalion regained its independence and became the Hawke's Bay Regiment.

=== Second World War ===
The Hawke's Bay Regiment remained in New Zealand for home defence during the Second World War and raised a 2nd Battalion in November 1940. The 2nd Battalion was detached in 1941 to form the Ruahine Regiment for a second time. Another 2nd Battalion was formed in February 1942 by redesignating the former 12th Battalion of the National Military Reserve. The 2nd Battalion was a stationary unit, intended to defend the east coast of the North Island from Japanese attack, while the 1st Battalion was intended to have a mobile reactive role as part of the 2nd Infantry Brigade, 4th Division. By June 1943, the war in the pacific was looking favourable for the Allies and a general stand-down was ordered in New Zealand. The 2nd Battalion was formally disbanded in April 1944.

Men from the Hawke's Bay Regiment saw combat with the battalions associated with the Central Military District. The 19th, 22nd and 25th battalions each had a company designated as C (Hawke's Bay) Company, which was affiliated with the Hawke's Bay Regiment. These battalions were part of the 2nd New Zealand Division and saw action in Greece, Crete, North Africa, Tunisia and Italy. The Hawke's Bay Regiment was also affiliated with the 36th Battalion of the 3rd New Zealand Division, which saw combat at the Treasury Islands.

=== Post War ===
Prince Philip, Duke of Edinburgh was appointed as the Colonel-in-Chief of the Hawke's Bay Regiment in 1953. The regiment was granted the freedom of the city of Napier in 1957 and in 1963 the Napier City Council paid for a new stand of colours for the regiment. The new colours were presented to the regiment by the Queen, the first time a New Zealand Military unit had been presented with colours by a reigning monarch.

In 1964 the Hawkes Bay regiment was amalgamated with the Wellington Regiment to become the 7th Battalion (Wellington (City of Wellington's Own) and Hawke's Bay), Royal New Zealand Infantry Regiment.

== Alliances ==
- United Kingdom – South Lancashire Regiment (1925-1958)
- United Kingdom – Lancashire Regiment (1958-1964)
- United Kingdom – Royal Berkshire Regiment
- Australia – 40th Battalion
- Canada – The Lincoln and Welland Regiment

== Notes ==
Footnotes

Citations
