= Ruahine Regiment =

17th (Ruahine) Regiment Ruahine regiment
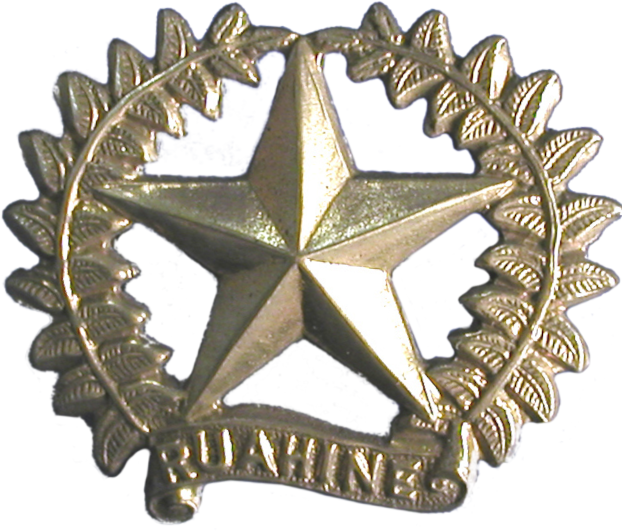
- Cap badge of the Ruahine Regiment
- Active: 1914–1921; 1941–1948
- Country: New Zealand
- Branch: New Zealand Military Forces
- Type: Infantry
- Garrison/HQ: Masterton
- Motto: Ad unum omnes (Latin: "Together as one").
- Engagements: First World War; Second World War

Commanders
- Honorary Colonel: Sir Walter Buchanan (1916-1921)

The Ruahine Regiment was a Territorial Force Infantry Regiment of the New Zealand Military Forces. It was briefly raised in the 1910s and saw service in the First World War as part of the Wellington Infantry Regiment. It was formed for a second time during the Second World War and was deployed overseas as part of the 3rd Division but never saw combat.

== History ==
=== First World War ===
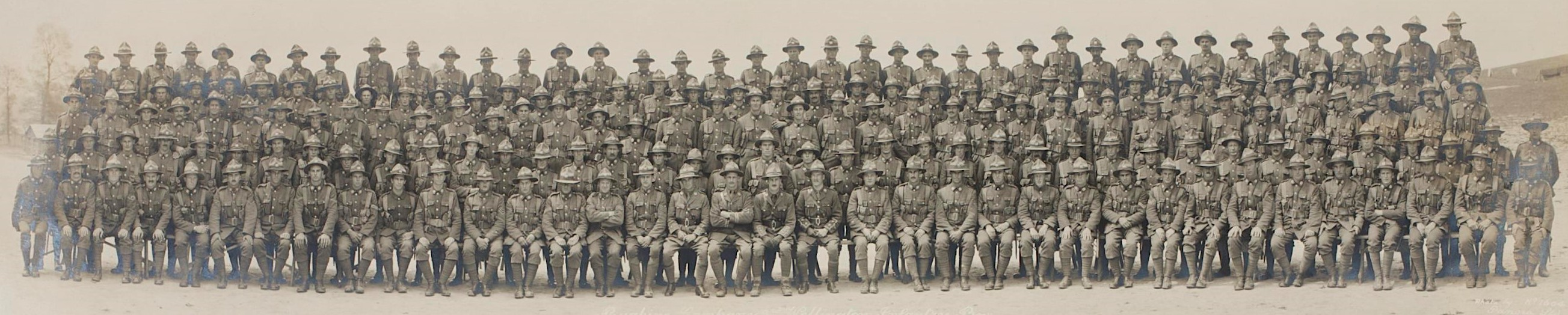
17th (Ruahine) Company of 3rd Battalion, Wellington Infantry Regiment. Codford, England,1917

In early 1914, the 17th (Ruahine) Regiment was formed by redesignating the 2nd Battalion, 9th (Wellington East Coast) Regiment (the 1st Battalion was retitled as the 9th (Hawke's Bay) Regiment). At the outbreak of the First World War in August 1914, the decision was made to form a New Zealand infantry brigade of four battalions from the existing territorial regiments. Men from the 17th (Ruahine) Regiment formed the 17th (Ruahine) Company of the Wellington Battalion, which saw service during the Gallipoli Campaign. Following the evacuation from Gallipoli in 1916, the Battalion became a regiment of two battalions. The Wellington Infantry Regiment would see action on the western front, engaging in the battles of the Somme, Messines, Broodseinde, Passchendaele, German Spring Offensive and the Hundred Days' Offensive. A third battalion was also raised in 1917, but was disbanded in 1918 due to manpower shortages. Both the 2nd and 3rd battalions were organised along the same lines as the 1st Battalion, each with their own eponymous 17th (Ruahine) Company. The Wellington Infantry Regiment was disbanded at the end of the war.

Sir Walter Buchanan, a former MP for Wairarapa, was appointed honorary colonel of the Regiment in 1916. In 1921, the 17th (Ruahine) Regiment was amalgamated with the 9th (Hawkes Bay) Regiment and became the 3rd Battalion, Wellington Regiment, which was later redesignated as the Hawke's Bay Regiment in 1923. The Ruahine Regiment received a stand of colours in 1923 which were immediately laid up in St Matthew's Church in Masterton as the Regiment no longer existed.

=== Second World War ===
The Hawke's Bay Regiment remained in New Zealand for home defence during the Second World War and raised a 2nd Battalion in November 1940. The 2nd Battalion was detached in 1941 to form the Ruahine Regiment for a second time. The Ruahine Regiment was initially based in New Zealand as part of the 4th Division, but in October 1942 it was decided that the regiment would join the 3rd Division in the Pacific. The regiment was deployed to New Caledonia in December and initially joined 8th Brigade. The Ruahine Regiment was later transferred to the 15th Brigade in April 1943, however due to manpower shortages, the brigade was disbanded in July 1943 and never saw action. The Ruahine Regiment continued to exist on paper until its formal disbandment in 1948.

The Ruahine Regiment was affiliated with the 19th, 22nd and 25th of the Second New Zealand Expeditionary Force and inherited their battle honours.
