= 12th (Nelson and Marlborough) Regiment =

- Active: 1860-1921
- Country: New Zealand
- Allegiance: Britain
- Branch: New Zealand Military Forces
- Type: Infantry
- Engagements: Second Boer War; First World War

Commanders
- Honorary Colonel: Major General Sir Edward Chaytor (1920-1921)

The 12th (Nelson and Marlborough) Regiment was a territorial infantry regiment of the New Zealand Military Forces. It was formed in 1911 from various volunteer corps raised during the second half of the nineteenth century. Men from the regiment saw combat in the First World War as part of the Canterbury Infantry Regiment. The 12th Regiment was amalgamated with the 13th (North Canterbury and Westland) Regiment in 1921, forming the 2nd Battalion, Canterbury Regiment, which was then redesignated as the 1st Battalion, Nelson, Marlborough and West Coast Regiment in 1923.

== History ==
The Nelson Volunteer Rifles were established in June 1860 and the Marlborough Rifle Volunteers were formed the next year. By the end of 1861 there were nine companies based in Nelson and two in Marlborough. The first West Coast based volunteer corps wasn't raised until 1868. Over the course of the late nineteenth century a large number of volunteer corps were raised and disbanded in Nelson, Marlborough and the West Coast. In 1901, the Nelson and Marlborough-based corps were grouped together into the 1st Battalion, Nelson Infantry volunteers, while the West Coast-based corps were grouped together into the 2nd Battalion. Men from these battalions served in South Africa during the Second Boer War as part of the New Zealand Mounted Rifles Contingents. The Nelson Battalions were subsequently awarded the battle honour "South Africa 1900-1902".

The Defence Act 1909 brought an end to the volunteer system and introduced a new territorial system of compulsory military training. As part of this reform the volunteer battalions became regiments in 1911. The 1st and 2nd Nelson Battalions were amalgamated into the 12th (Nelson) Regiment. A reorganisation in 1912 redefined the recruiting areas of a number of the South Island-based Regiments and the West Coast-based companies of the 12th Regiment were transferred to the 13th (North Canterbury and Westland) Regiment.

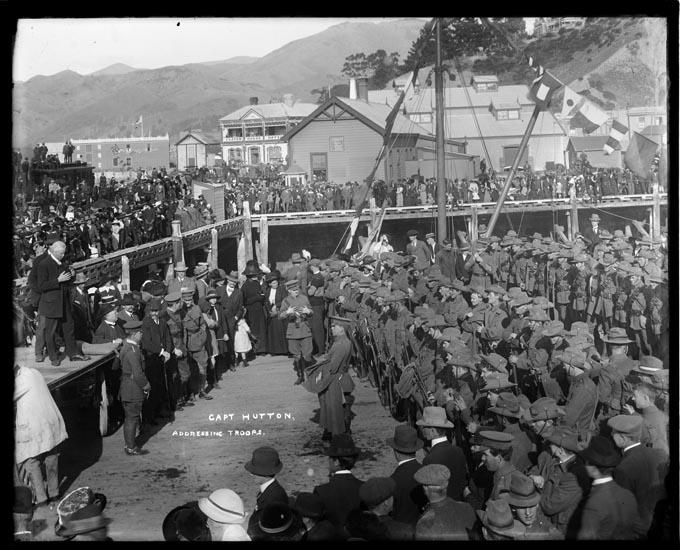
Men of the 12th Nelson Regiment at Nelson wharf at the beginning of the First World War

At the outbreak of the First World War in August 1914, the decision was made to form a New Zealand infantry brigade of four battalions from the existing territorial regiments. Men from the 12th (Nelson) Regiment formed the 12th (Nelson) Company of the Canterbury Battalion, which saw service during the Gallipoli Campaign. Following the evacuation from Gallipoli in 1916, the Battalion was expanded to a regiment of two battalions. The Canterbury Infantry Regiment would see action on the western front, engaging in the battles of the Somme, Messines, Broodseinde, Passchendaele, German Spring Offensive and the Hundred Days' Offensive. In 1917, the name of the regiment and its respective companies in the Canterbury Infantry Regiment were changed to the 12th (Nelson and Marlborough) Regiment. A third battalion of the Canterbury Infantry Regiment was also raised in 1917, but was disbanded in 1918 due to manpower shortages. Both the 2nd and 3rd Battalions were organised along the same lines as the 1st Battalion, each with their own 12th (Nelson and Marlborough) Company. The Canterbury Infantry Regiment was disbanded at the end of the war.

One member of the regiment, private Henry Nicholas, won the Victoria Cross during the war. Nicholas was serving in 12th Company of the 1st battalion, Canterbury Infantry Regiment and was awarded the VC for single-handedly capturing a German strong point near Polderhoek Chateau on 3 December 1917.

In 1920 Major General Sir Edward Chaytor, Commandant of the New Zealand Military Forces, was appointed as Honorary Colonel of the regiment. A reorganisation of the New Zealand Military Forces in 1921 saw the seventeen territorial regiments amalgamated into four larger regiments, similar to those of the New Zealand Expeditionary Force. The 12th (Nelson and Marlborough) Regiment amalgamated with the 13th (North Canterbury and Westland) Regiment to form the 2nd Battalion, Canterbury Regiment, while the 1st (Canterbury) Regiment and 2nd (South Canterbury) Regiment amalgamated to form the 1st Battalion. The amalgamation was short lived and in 1923 the 2nd Battalion was redesignated as the 1st Battalion, Nelson, Marlborough and West Coast Regiment.
