= 13th (North Canterbury and Westland) Regiment =

- Active: 1898–1921
- Country: New Zealand
- Allegiance: Britain
- Branch: New Zealand Military Forces
- Type: Infantry
- Motto: Kia ponu tonu (Maori: Be faithful)
- Engagements: Second Boer War; First World War

Commanders
- Honorary Colonel: Arthur Pole Penton

The 13th (North Canterbury and Westland) Regiment was a territorial infantry regiment of the New Zealand Military Forces. It was formed in 1911 from various volunteer corps raised during the second half of the nineteenth century. Men from the regiment saw combat in the First World War as part of the Canterbury Infantry Regiment. It was amalgamated with the 12th (Nelson and Marlborough) Regiment to form the 2nd Battalion, Canterbury Regiment in 1921, which was redesignated as the 1st Battalion, Nelson, Marlborough and West Coast Regiment in 1923.

== History ==
In 1859 the Governor of New Zealand defined the Christchurch Military district and by 1861 six companies had been formed in the district. Over the course of the following five decades a large number of volunteer corps were raised and disbanded in Canterbury. In 1886 the Canterbury-based corps were grouped together into the 1st Battalion, Canterbury Rifle Volunteers, although the battalion was disestablished 2 years later. The battalion organisation returned in 1895, this time called the Canterbury Battalion of Infantry Volunteers, which was retitled as the North Canterbury Battalion of Infantry Volunteers in 1897, when the South Canterbury corps were detached and formed their own battalion.

Men from the North Canterbury Battalion served in South Africa during the Second Boer War as part of the New Zealand Mounted Rifles Contingents. The Battalion was subsequently awarded the battle honour "South Africa 1900-1902". A further increase in size saw most of the North Canterbury-based corps split off in 1903 to form the 2nd North Canterbury Battalion of Infantry Volunteers, while the original battalion was retitled as 1st North Canterbury Battalion of Infantry Volunteers. The oldest corps of the new 2nd Battalion was the Sydenham Rifles, formed in 1898.

The Defence Act 1909 brought an end to the volunteer system and introduced a new territorial system of compulsory military training. As part of this reform the volunteer battalions became regiments in 1911, with the 2nd North Canterbury Battalion of Infantry Volunteers redesignated as the 13th (North Canterbury) Regiment. Major-General Arthur Pole Penton was appointed Honorary Colonel of the regiment in 1911.

Initially both the 13th (North Canterbury) Regiment and the 1st (Canterbury) Regiment (the former 1st North Canterbury Battalion) had companies based in Christchurch and North Canterbury. A reorganisation in 1912 redefined the recruiting areas so that 1st Regiment recruited solely from the Christchurch area, while North Canterbury was exclusively allocated to the 13th Regiment. Additionally, the recruiting area of the 13th Regiment was expanded to include Westland, absorbing the Hokitika, Greymouth, Reefton and Millerton based companies of the 12th (Nelson) Regiment. The title of the regiment was consequently changed to the 13th (North Canterbury and Westland) Regiment.

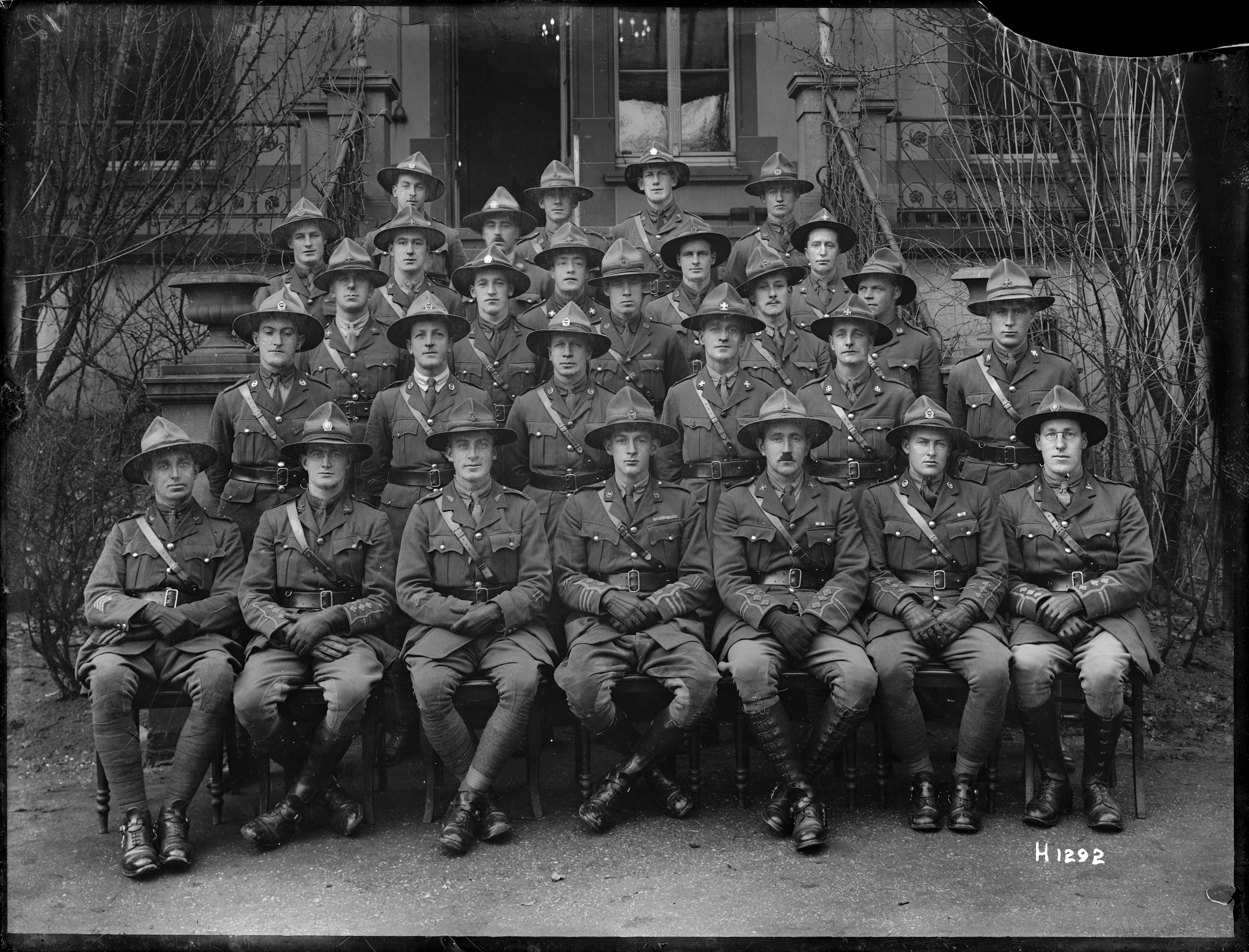
Officers of the Canterbury Infantry Regiment in Germany, 1919

At the outbreak of the First World War in August 1914, the decision was made to form a New Zealand infantry brigade of four battalions from the existing territorial regiments. Men from the 13th (North Canterbury and Westland) Regiment formed the 13th (North Canterbury and Westland) Company of the Canterbury Battalion, which saw service during the Gallipoli Campaign. Following the evacuation from Gallipoli in 1916, the Battalion was expanded to a regiment of two battalions. The Canterbury Infantry Regiment would see action on the western front, engaging in the battles of the Somme, Messines, Broodseinde, Passchendaele, German Spring Offensive and the Hundred Days' Offensive. A third battalion was also raised in 1917, but was disbanded in 1918 due to manpower shortages. Both the 2nd and 3rd Battalions were organised along the same lines as the 1st Battalion, each with their own 13th (North Canterbury and Westland) Company. The Canterbury Infantry Regiment was disbanded at the end of the war.

A reorganisation of the New Zealand Military Forces in 1921 saw the seventeen territorial regiments amalgamated into four larger regiments, similar to those of the New Zealand Expeditionary Force. The 13th (North Canterbury and Westland) Regiment amalgamated with the 12th (Nelson and Marlborough) Regiment to form the 2nd Battalion, Canterbury Regiment, while the 1st (Canterbury) Regiment and 2nd (South Canterbury) Regiment formed the 1st Battalion. The amalgamation was short lived and in 1923 the 2nd Battalion was redesignated as the 1st Battalion, Nelson, Marlborough and West Coast Regiment.
