= New Zealand Expeditionary Force =

New Zealand military forces

The New Zealand Expeditionary Force (NZEF) was the title of the military forces sent from New Zealand to fight alongside other British Empire and Dominion troops during World War I (1914–1918) and World War II (1939–1945). Ultimately, the NZEF of World War I became known as the First New Zealand Expeditionary Force. The NZEF of World War II was known as the Second New Zealand Expeditionary Force (2NZEF).

The 2NZEF was led by General Bernard Freyberg.

== 1st New Zealand Expeditionary Force ==
The New Zealand Expeditionary Force (NZEF) was the title of the military forces sent from New Zealand to fight for Britain during World War I. Upon the outbreak of war, New Zealand immediately offered to provide two brigades—one of infantry and one of mounted troops—with a total of 8,500 men. As was the case with the Australian army the existing New Zealand army was a "territorial" force, designed for the defense of the home islands. It could not be deployed overseas. Hence, it was necessary to form a volunteer "expeditionary" force. The initial contingent of the NZEF, known as the "Main Body", sailed on 16 October 1914 for Australia and then joined with the Australian Imperial Force (AIF) in a convoy that sailed for Egypt on 1 November. The NZEF and AIF convoy was originally bound for Britain but diverted en route to Egypt because of the state of the training camps in England. As a result, the troops were dressed in woolen uniforms for the British climate. On 2 December the convoy reached Alexandria after passing through the Suez Canal. Disembarking the troops traveled by train for Cairo, bivouacking in tent camps within sight of the Pyramids.

The NZEF was commanded throughout the war by Major General Alexander Godley, a British Army officer who in 1910, on the recommendation of Lord Kitchener, had been appointed as the commander of the New Zealand Military Forces. After Godley departed with the NZEF in October 1914, Major General Alfred William Robin commanded the New Zealand Military Forces at home throughout the war as commandant, and was pivotal in ensuring the ongoing provision of reinforcements and support to the NZEF.

Major General George Napier Johnston CB CMG DSO (1867–1947) served with New Zealand forces during World War I as director of ordnance and commander of permanent artillery in the New Zealand Defence Force from the outset of World War I during 1914–1918.

New Zealand, like Australia, had a pre-war policy of compulsory military training, but, like Australia, New Zealand's Territorial Army could not be deployed overseas. Thus, the NZEF was initially composed solely of volunteers. Conscription was introduced on 1 August 1916 and by the end of the war 124,000 men—nearly half the eligible male population of 250,000—had served with the NZEF. Of these, about 100,000 had been sent overseas.

The NZEF was closely tied to the AIF for much of the war. When the Gallipoli campaign began, the New Zealand contingent was insufficient to complete a division of their own, so it was combined with the Australian 4th Infantry Brigade to form the New Zealand and Australian Division under the command of General Godley. This division, along with the Australian 1st Division, formed the famous Australian and New Zealand Army Corps (ANZAC) under the command of General William Birdwood.

After the end of the Gallipoli campaign, the NZEF formed its own infantry division, the New Zealand Division, which served on the Western Front for the rest of the war. General Godley was promoted to a corps command and given II ANZAC Corps, which contained the New Zealand Division. From 1916 until the formation of the Australian Corps in 1918 (made up of the five Australian divisions) there were always two "ANZAC" corps—I ANZAC Corps and II ANZAC Corps—despite the fact that there was only one New Zealand Division. During early 1916 the New Zealand Government supported the formation of an Australian and New Zealand Army, but this did not occur.

The mounted arm of the NZEF was the New Zealand Mounted Rifles Brigade. The brigade remained in Egypt and, combined with the 1st and 2nd Australian Light Horse Brigades, made up the ANZAC Mounted Division which served through the Sinai and Palestine campaign.

The New Zealand Expeditionary Force (later called the 1st NZEF) was finally disbanded on 31 December 1921.

=== Structure ===
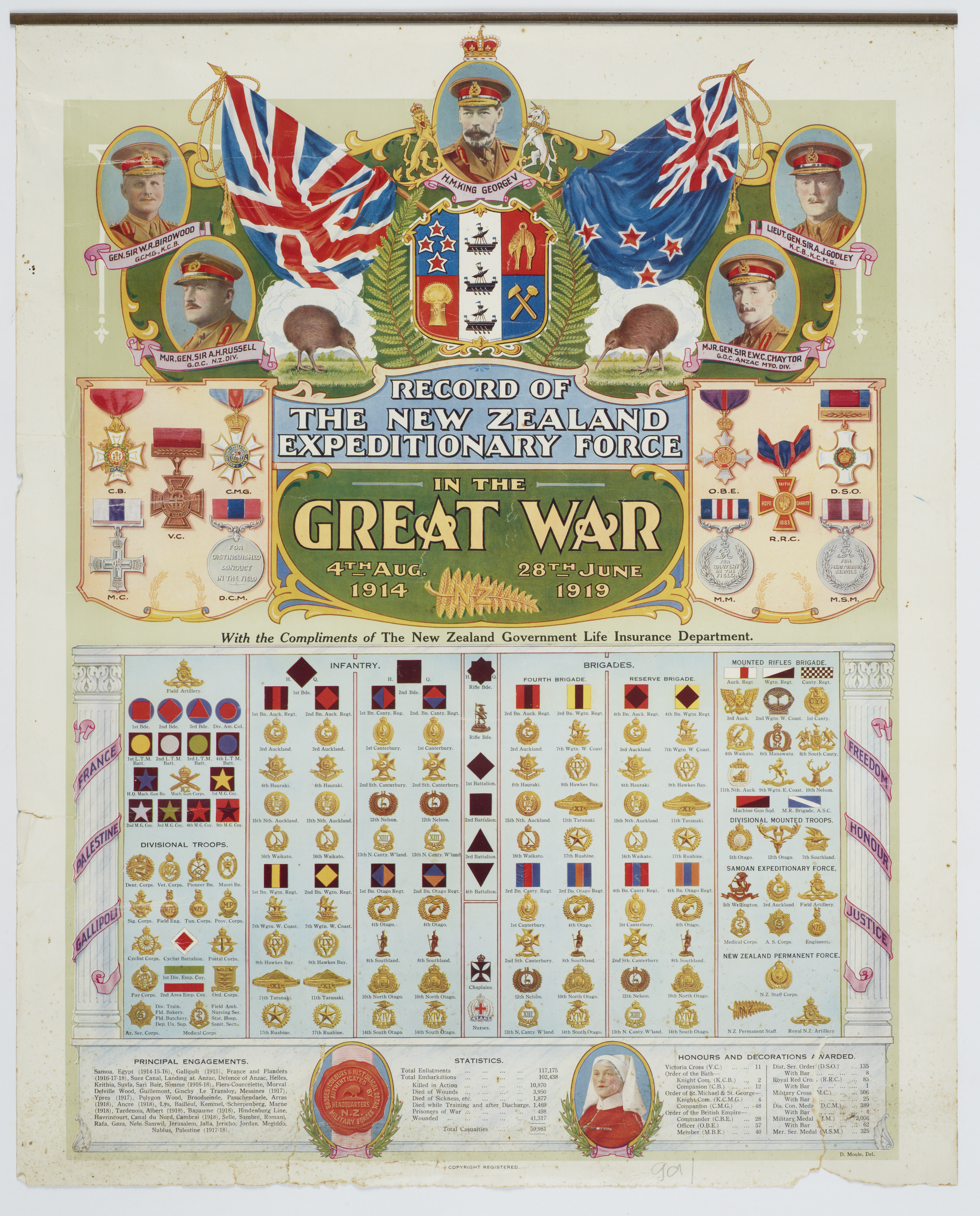
Insignia of units of the New Zealand Expeditionary Force

==== New Zealand Expeditionary Force Order of Battle – 16 October 1914 ====
- New Zealand Infantry Brigade
  - Auckland Battalion: 4 Cos. raised from 3rd (Auckland), 6th (Hauraki), 15th (North Auckland), and 16th (Waikato) Territorial Regiments
  - Wellington Battalion: 4 Cos. raised from 7th (Wellington West Coast), 9th (Hawke's Bay), 11th (Taranaki), and 17th (Ruahine) Territorial Regiments
  - Canterbury Battalion: 4 Cos. raised from 1st (Canterbury), 2nd (South Canterbury), 12th (Nelson), and 13th (North Canterbury and Westland) Territorial Regiments
  - Otago Battalion: 4 Cos. raised from 4th (Otago), 8th (Southland), 10th (North Otago), and 14th (South Otago) Territorial Regiments
  - 1st New Zealand Infantry Brigade Signal Co. (3 Sections)
  - New Zealand Field Ambulance No. 1
- New Zealand Mounted Rifles Brigade
  - Auckland Mounted Rifles: 3 raised from these territorial regiments: 3rd (Auckland) Mounted Rifles, 4th (Waikato) Mounted Rifles, and 11th (North Auckland) Mounted Rifles
  - Canterbury Mounted Rifles: 3 squadrons raised from these territorial regiments: 1st Mounted Rifles (Canterbury Yeomanry Cavalry), 8th (South Canterbury) Mounted Rifles, and 10th (Nelson) Mounted Rifles
  - Wellington Mounted Rifles: 3 squadrons raised from these territorial regiments: 2nd (Wellington West Coast) Mounted Rifles, 6th (Manawatu) Mounted Rifles, 9th (Wellington East Coast) Mounted Rifles
  - New Zealand Engineers Field Troop
  - New Zealand Mounted Signal Troop
  - New Zealand Mounted Rifles Field Ambulance
- Divisional cavalry
  - Otago Mounted Rifles: 3 squadrons raised from these territorial regiments: 5th (Otago Hussars), 7th (Southland), 12th (Otago)
- New Zealand Field Artillery Brigade
  - 1st Field Battery
  - 2nd Field Battery
  - 3rd Field Battery
  - 1st Brigade Ammunition Column

== 2nd New Zealand Expeditionary Force ==
=== Formation ===
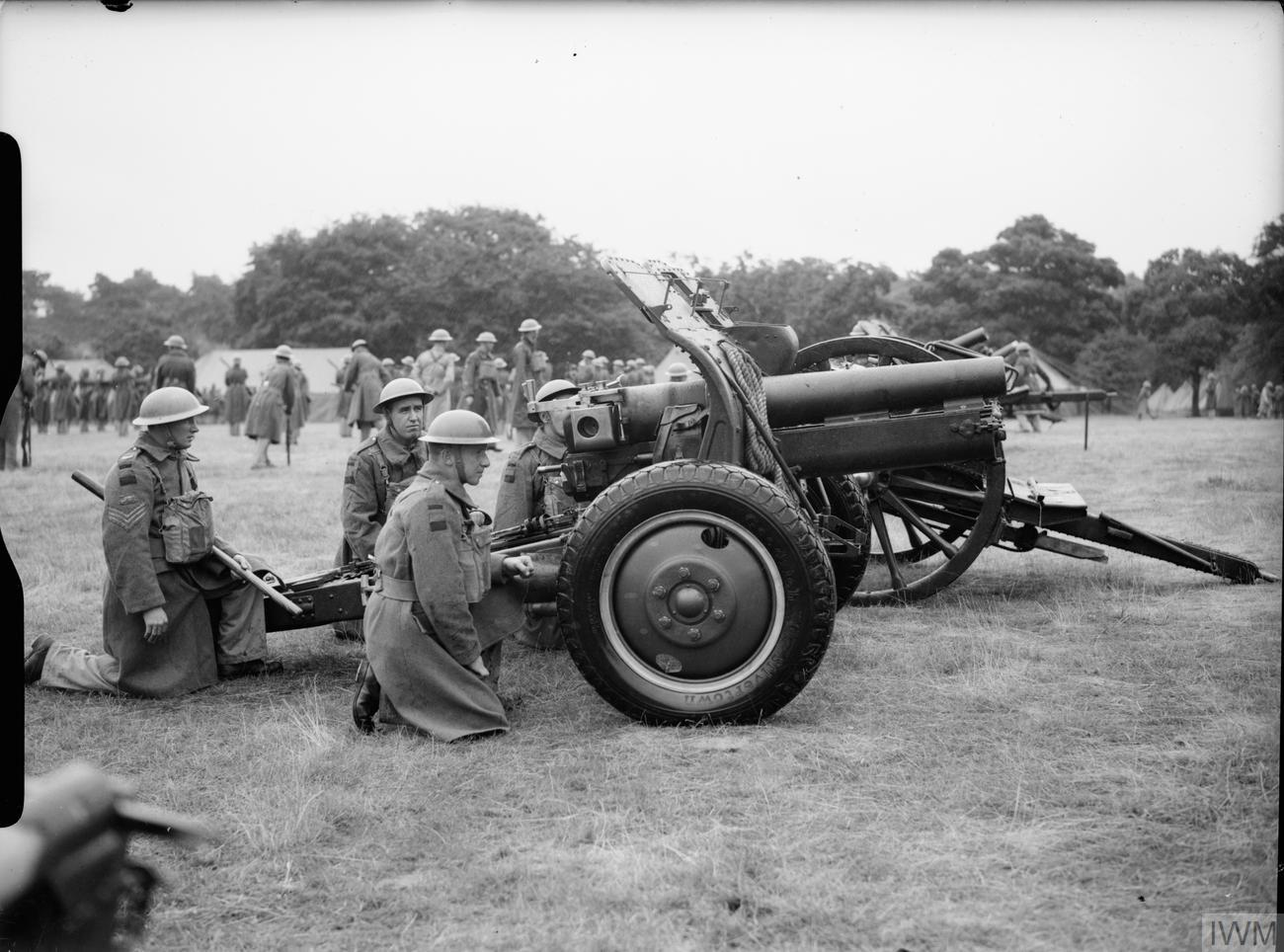
4.5-inch howitzer and crew of the New Zealand Expeditionary Force during an inspection by King George VI at Burley in the New Forest, Hampshire, England.

At the outbreak of World War II in September 1939, the New Zealand Government declared war on Germany. Within a few days, the government pronounced the assembly of what would be an Expeditionary Force, which become known as the 2nd New Zealand Expeditionary Force (2NZEF), for service in the war. After consulting with the British Government, it was decided to raise an infantry division. This, the 2nd New Zealand Division, would be commanded by Major-General Bernard Freyberg, a British Army officer who had spent his early years in New Zealand and won a Victoria Cross in the First World War, ending it as a brigadier general, who had offered his services to the New Zealand Government. Freyberg would also be the commander of the 2NZEF.

=== Service in Africa and Europe ===
The first echelon of 2NZEF Headquarters and a Brigade Group landed in Egypt in February 1940. The second echelon, also a Brigade Group, was diverted to Britain on Italy's entry into the war and did not reach Egypt until March 1941. The third echelon arrived in Egypt in September 1940 and concentration of the division was completed just before it was deployed to northern Greece in March 1941.

This force remained as part of the British Eighth Army to the end of World War II in 1945 during which it fought in the Battle of Greece (March–April 1941), the Battle of Crete (May), Operation Crusader (November–December), Minqar Qaim (June 1942), the First (July) and Second Battles of El Alamein (October–November), Libya and Tunisia (December–May 1943), the Sangro (October–December), the Battle of Monte Cassino (February–March 1944), the Central Italy (May–December), and the Adriatic Coast (April–May 1945).

Under the command of Major-General William Stevens, the 2NZEF began demobilising in late 1945, a process that was largely completed by mid-1946. Lt. Gen John C. H. Lee, Deputy Theater Commander of the Mediterranean Theater at this time, noted in his diary attending the termination ceremony of the New Zealand Force at Caserta, Italy on 3 September 1946.

=== Service in the Pacific ===
The 2NZEF also had a Pacific Section, which was initially responsible for the defence of Fiji. The basis for the Pacific Section was initially an infantry brigade—the 8th Infantry Brigade—which arrived on Viti Levu, the main island of Fiji, in November 1940. Following the entry of the Japanese Empire into the war, in early 1942, the 2NZEF contingent in Fiji was expanded to two brigades, and formally designated Pacific Section, 2NZEF. Under the command of Major General Owen Mead, the Pacific Section was withdrawn from Fiji back to New Zealand when the United States 37th Division took over defence responsibility.

The Pacific Section later became the 3rd Division, the main unit of the 2NZEF in the Pacific. After of period of training in New Zealand, it fought in the Solomon Islands campaign during 1943–1944, participating in the Battles of Vella Lavella, the Treasury Islands and the Green Islands, although never as a full division.

In early 1944, the New Zealand Government faced a manpower crisis caused by the demands of maintaining two divisions overseas while simultaneously maintaining agricultural and industrial production to meet the needs of the Allied countries. In order to cope with this crisis the New Zealand Government saw no option other than to disband one of the country's two infantry divisions. The decision to disband the 3rd Division was made after consulting with the British and United States Governments, who were of the view that the 2nd Division's contribution to the campaign in Italy was of greater importance than the 3rd Division's contribution in the Pacific.

The 3rd Division was withdrawn to New Caledonia in June 1944 and returned to New Zealand in August. The Division was rapidly downsized and was formally disbanded on 20 October 1944. About 4,000 veterans of the 3rd NZ Division were dispatched to Italy to reinforce the 2nd Division with the remaining men of the division returning to civilian employment.

== 3rd New Zealand Expeditionary Force ==
From 1950 onwards a division-sized force, reserves (Territorial Force) maintained by conscription, formed the principal striking force of the New Zealand Army. The division was alternatively known as 3NZEF. It disbanded in 1961.

== See also ==
- Military history of New Zealand in World War I
- Māori Battalion
- New Zealand Forces Club
- New Zealand Tunnelling Company
- Buttes New British Cemetery (New Zealand) Memorial
