= Edward Chaytor =

New Zealand general (1868–1939)

Sir Edward Walter Clervaux Chaytor
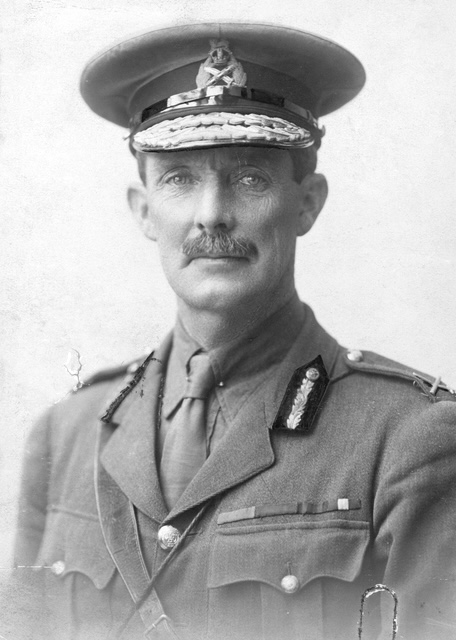
- Chaytor, c. 1918
- Born: 21 June 1868; Motueka, New Zealand
- Died: 15 June 1939 (aged 70); London, England
- Military career
- Allegiance: New Zealand
- Branch: New Zealand Army
- Service years: 1886–1924
- Rank: Major General
- Nickname: Fiery Ted
- Commands: New Zealand Military Forces (1919–24); ANZAC Mounted Division (1917–18); New Zealand Mounted Rifles Brigade (1915–17); Wellington Military District (1910–14); South Island Battalion (1902)
- Conflicts: Second Boer War; First World War; Gallipoli Campaign; Sinai and Palestine Campaign
- Awards: Knight Commander of St Michael and St George; Knight Commander of the Royal Victorian Order; Commander of the Order of the Bath; Mentioned in Despatches (7); Order of the Nile (Egypt); Commander of the Order of the White Eagle (Serbia)

Major General Sir Edward Walter Clervaux Chaytor, KCMG, KCVO, CB, ADC (21 June 1868 – 15 June 1939) was a commander of New Zealand troops in the Boer War and the First World War.

== Early life and family ==
Born in Motueka, New Zealand, Chaytor was the son of John Clervaux Chaytor and his wife Emma, daughter of Edward Fearon. His paternal great-grandfather was the industrialist and politician Sir William Chaytor, 1st Baronet. He was educated at Nelson College from 1880 to 1884, and was then a sheep farmer at Spring Creek near Blenheim.

Chaytor married Louisa Jane Collins, daughter of Charles Sweeney Collins, on 17 October 1898. Together they had three children. Son Edward John Clervaux Chaytor (1903–1976) was a Brigadier in the Royal Artillery; daughter Katherine, married Sir Robert Gooch, 11th Baronet.

== Military career ==
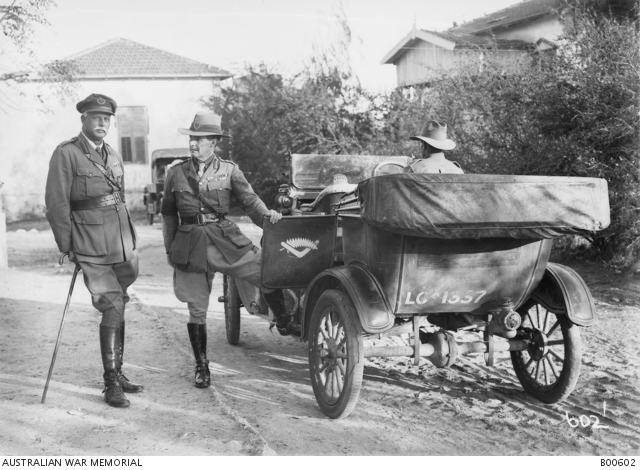
Major General Chaytor (right) with Brigadier General Charles Frederick Cox in Rishon Lezion, November 1918.

In the Boer War Chaytor was a captain in the Third New Zealand Contingent and a lieutenant colonel in the Eighth New Zealand Contingent. After the Boer War Chaytor became a professional officer in the New Zealand Army.

In the First World War he was in the New Zealand Expeditionary Force in Egypt and Gallipoli and was made a Companion of the Order of the Bath (CB) in the 1915 Birthday Honours. At the end of 1915, he was given command of the New Zealand Mounted Rifles Brigade, which was part of the Egyptian Expeditionary Force in the Sinai and Palestine campaign and soon after was promoted to brigadier. In 1916 prior to the Battle of Romani he personally reconnoitred the Turkish position from an aircraft. He was appointed a Companion of the Order of St Michael and St George (CMG) in the 1917 New Year Honours.

In 1917, Chaytor took over the Australian and New Zealand Mounted Division, and was promoted to temporary major general in April. When taking part in the assault on Rafa he ignored Chetwode's order to withdraw from the attack and took the town's main defensive position. In 1918 Chaytor's Force captured Amman in Jordan and thousands of prisoners.

== Later life ==
Chaytor was appointed Commandant of the New Zealand Military Forces in 1919 and in this role oversaw a major reorganisation of the Territorial Force. On the occasion of the royal visit by Edward, Prince of Wales to Australia and New Zealand, he was appointed a Knight Commander of the Royal Victorian Order in 1920. He was appointed honorary colonel of the 1st (Canterbury) and 12th (Nelson and Marlborough) Regiments in 1920. He retired from the military in 1924, being replaced as commandant by Major General Charles Melvill. He lived in London until his death on 15 June 1939.

== See also ==
- Chaytor baronets

Military offices
Preceded by Major General Alfred William Robin	Commandant of New Zealand Military Forces; December 1919 – March 1924	Succeeded by Major General Charles Melvill
Preceded by Major General Harry Chauvel	General Officer Commanding ANZAC Mounted Division; 1917–1918	Succeeded by Brigadier General Granville Ryrie
