= 1st (Canterbury) Regiment =

- Active: 1860–1921
- Country: New Zealand
- Allegiance: Britain
- Branch: New Zealand Military Forces
- Type: Infantry
- Motto(s): Ake ake kia kaha (Maori: be strong forever)
- Engagements: Second Boer War; First World War

Commanders
- Colonel-in-Chief: King George V (1912–1921)
- Honorary Colonel: Major General Sir Edward Chaytor (1920–1921)

The 1st (Canterbury) Regiment was a territorial infantry regiment of the New Zealand Military Forces. It was formed in 1911 from various volunteer corps raised during the second half of the nineteenth century. Men from the regiment saw combat in the First World War as part of the Canterbury Infantry Regiment. It was amalgamated with the 2nd (South Canterbury) Regiment in 1921 to form the 1st Battalion, Canterbury Regiment.

== History ==
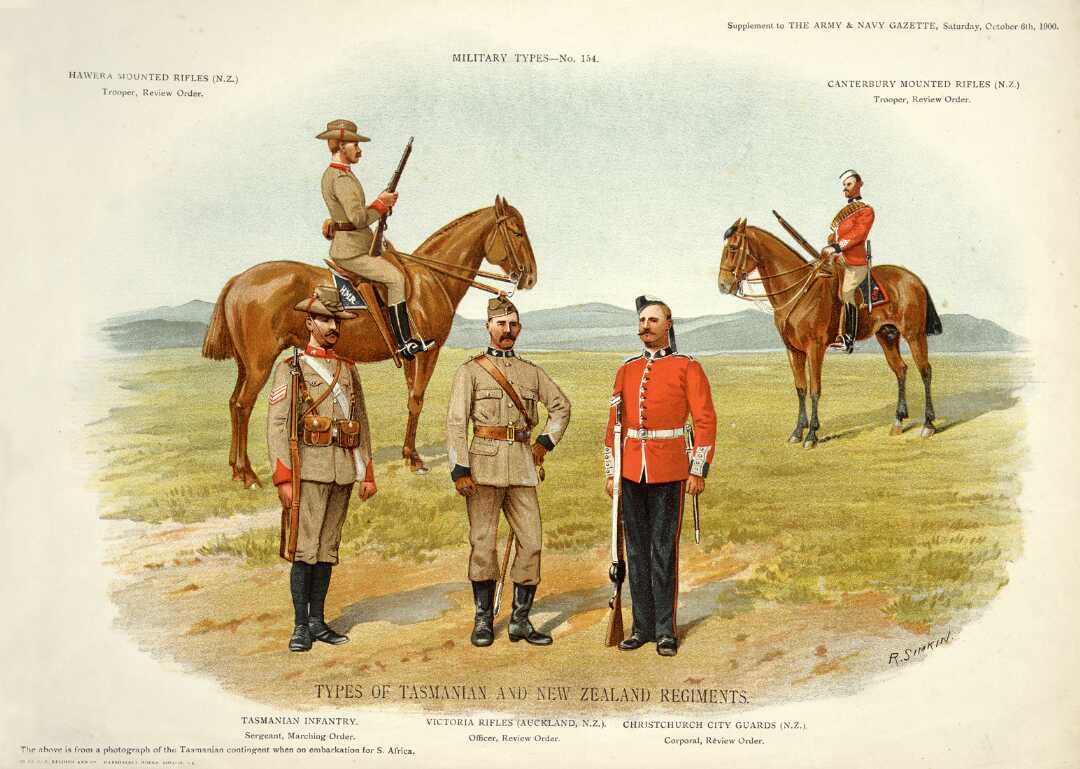
The Christchurch City Guards (bottom Right), 1900

In 1859 the Governor of New Zealand defined the Christchurch Military district and by 1861 six companies had been formed in the district. Over the course of the following five decades, a large number of volunteer corps were raised and disbanded in Canterbury. The longest continuously serving corps of the Canterbury district was the Southern Volunteer Rifles, formed in 1860. The Southern Volunteer Rifles was retitled as the Forest Rifle Volunteers in 1861 before changing to its final name, the Christchurch City Guards, in 1879. The Christchurch City Guards provided the seniority to the future 1st Regiment.

In 1886, the Canterbury-based corps were grouped together into the 1st Battalion, Canterbury Rifle Volunteers, although the battalion was disestablished 2 years later. The Battalion organisation returned in 1895, this time called the Canterbury Battalion of Infantry Volunteers, which was retitled as the North Canterbury Battalion of Infantry Volunteers in 1897, when the South Canterbury corps were detached and formed their own battalion.

Men from the North Canterbury Battalion served in South Africa during the Second Boer War as part of the New Zealand Mounted Rifles Contingents. The Battalion was subsequently awarded the battle honour "South Africa 1900–1902". A further increase in size saw most of the North Canterbury-based corps split off to form the 2nd North Canterbury Battalion of Infantry Volunteers in 1903 and the original battalion retitled as 1st North Canterbury Battalion of Infantry Volunteers.

The Defence Act 1909 brought about an end to the volunteer system and introduced a new territorial system of compulsory military training. In 1911, the 1st North Canterbury Battalion was redesignated as the 1st (Canterbury) Regiment. Initially both the 1st (Canterbury) and the 13th (North Canterbury) Regiments (the former 2nd North Canterbury Battalion) had companies based in Christchurch and North Canterbury. A reorganisation in 1912 redefined the recruiting areas so that 1st Regiment recruited solely from the Christchurch area, while North Canterbury was entirely allocated to the 13th Regiment. King George V was appointed as Colonel-in-Chief of the 1st (Canterbury) Regiment in 1912.

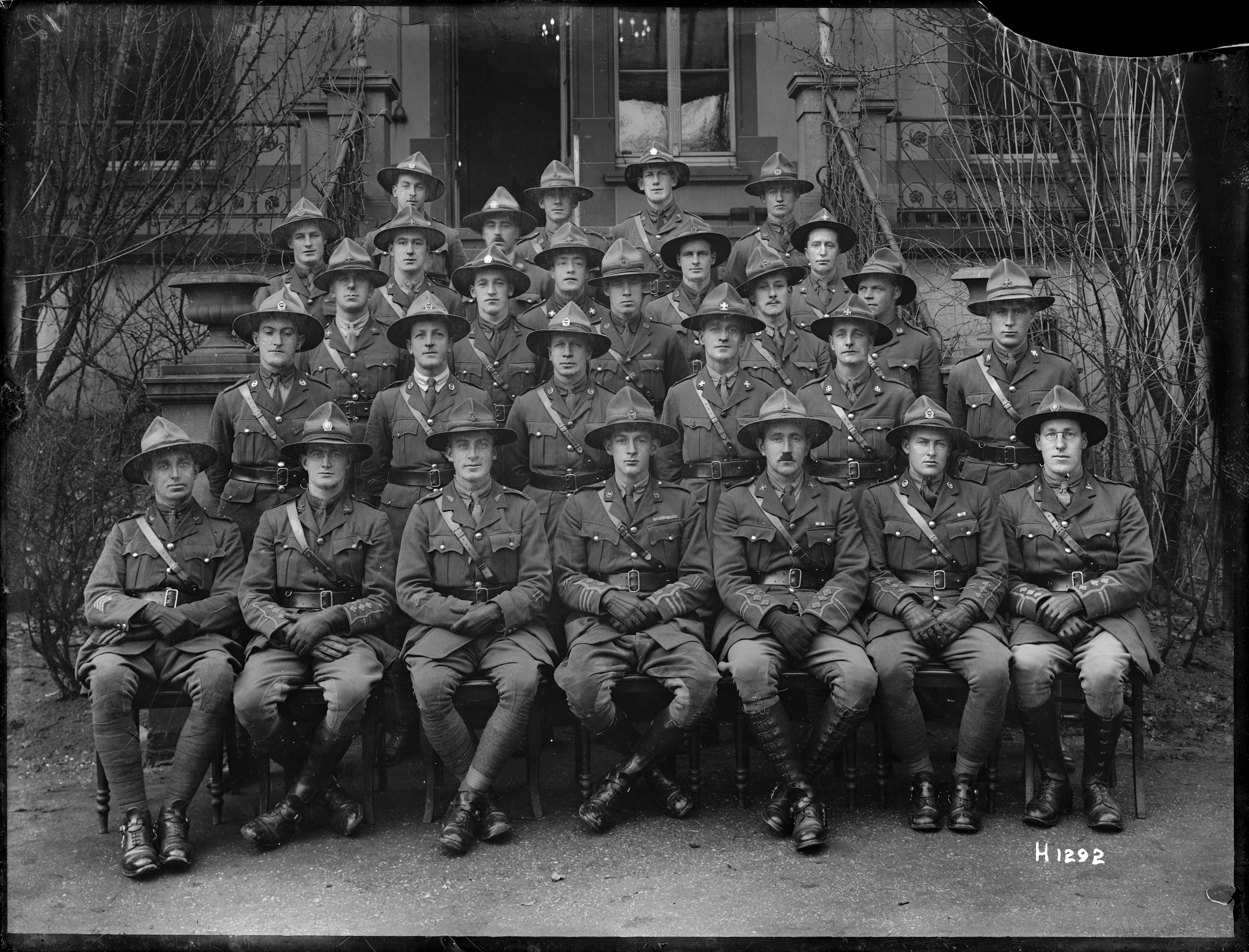
Officers of the Canterbury Infantry Regiment in Germany, 1919

At the outbreak of the First World War in August 1914, the decision was made to form a New Zealand infantry brigade of four battalions from the existing territorial regiments. Men from the 1st (Canterbury) Regiment formed the 1st (Canterbury) Company of the Canterbury Battalion, which saw service during the Gallipoli Campaign. Following the evacuation from Gallipoli in 1916, the Battalion was expanded to a regiment of two battalions. The Canterbury Infantry Regiment would see action on the western front, engaging in the battles of the Somme, Messines, Broodseinde, Passchendaele, German Spring Offensive and the Hundred Days' Offensive. A third battalion was also raised in 1917, but was disbanded in 1918 due to manpower shortages. Both the 2nd and 3rd Battalions were organised along the same lines as the 1st Battalion, each with their own 1st (Canterbury) Company. The Canterbury Infantry Regiment was disbanded at the end of the war.

In 1920 Major General Sir Edward Chaytor was appointed as Honorary Colonel of the regiment. Chaytor was Commandant of the New Zealand Military Forces between 1919 and 1924, and had commanded the ANZAC Mounted Division during the war. A reorganisation of the New Zealand Military Forces in 1921 saw the 1st (Canterbury) Regiment amalgamate with the 2nd (South Canterbury) Regiment to form the 1st Battalion, Canterbury Regiment.

== Alliances ==
United Kingdom – Queen's Own (Royal West Kent Regiment) (1913–1921)
