= 4th New Zealand Contingent =

Second Boer War volunteer military unit

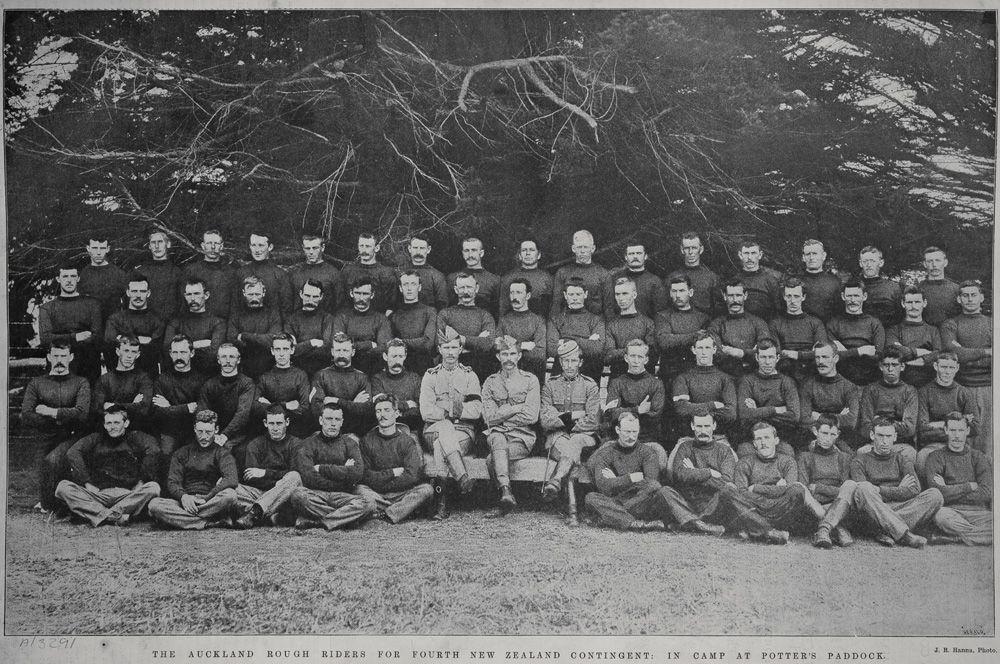
Auckland members of the Fourth New Zealand Contingent in camp in Auckland before deployment to South Africa.

The 4th New Zealand Contingent was one of ten contingents of New Zealand volunteers for service during the Second Boer War.

== History ==
It served from April 1900 through to June 1901. The contingent went from New Zealand to Beira, Portuguese East Africa in the SS Gymeric, though there was a "mutiny" on the Gymeric in Lyttelton Harbour on 27 March 1900 over conditions on board. When they arrived in Beira, part of the contingent was sectioned off to form battery units.

The contingent took more than two months to reach the front line, traveling via train and on horseback through Rhodesia and Beira. Between August 1900 and May 1901, the contingent fought several small skirmishes against Boer commandos in northern Transvaal. Their most significant action was to seize an artillery unit and a supply column under the command of General Koos de la Rey, capturing 135 Boer soldiers on 24 March 1901. On 28 January 1901, William Hardham was involved in an action that earned him the Victoria Cross, the only one awarded to a New Zealander in that war.

The Fourth Contingent left South Africa in the SS Tagus in June 1901.

== See also ==
- List of Second Boer War Victoria Cross recipients
- List of New Zealand units in the Second Boer War
