= Canterbury Infantry Regiment (NZEF) =

Military unit of the New Zealand Expeditionary Force

- Active: 1914–1919
- Country: New Zealand
- Allegiance: British Empire
- Branch: New Zealand Military Forces
- Role: Infantry
- Size: 3 Battalions
- Part of: New Zealand and Australian Division (1915–1916); New Zealand Division (1916–1919)
- Engagements: Egypt 1915–16, Gallipoli Campaign, France and Flanders 1916–18, Battle of the Somme, Battle of Messines (1917), Ypres 1917, Battle of Passchendaele, Battle of Bapaume 1918, Battle of Cambrai (1918)

Commanders
- Notable commanders: Charles Henry Brown; Robert Young

Insignia

The Canterbury Infantry Regiment was a military unit of the New Zealand Expeditionary Force (NZEF) raised for service in the First World War. It saw service in the Gallipoli Campaign (1915) and on the Western Front (1916–1919). The regiment was formed by grouping together companies from four different territorial regiments based in the Canterbury Military district.

== History ==
The regiment was formed in 1914 as the Canterbury Battalion. The battalion consisted of four rifle companies, with each company raised from one of the territorial regiments of the Canterbury military district, namely the:

- 1st (Canterbury) Regiment
- 2nd (South Canterbury) Regiment
- 12th (Nelson) Regiment (Note: 12th (Nelson & Marlborough) Regiment from 1917)
- 13th (North Canterbury and Westland) Regiment

Each company retained the name and cap badge of its parent territorial regiment.

== Notes ==
Footnotes

Citations
