= 2nd (South Canterbury) Regiment =

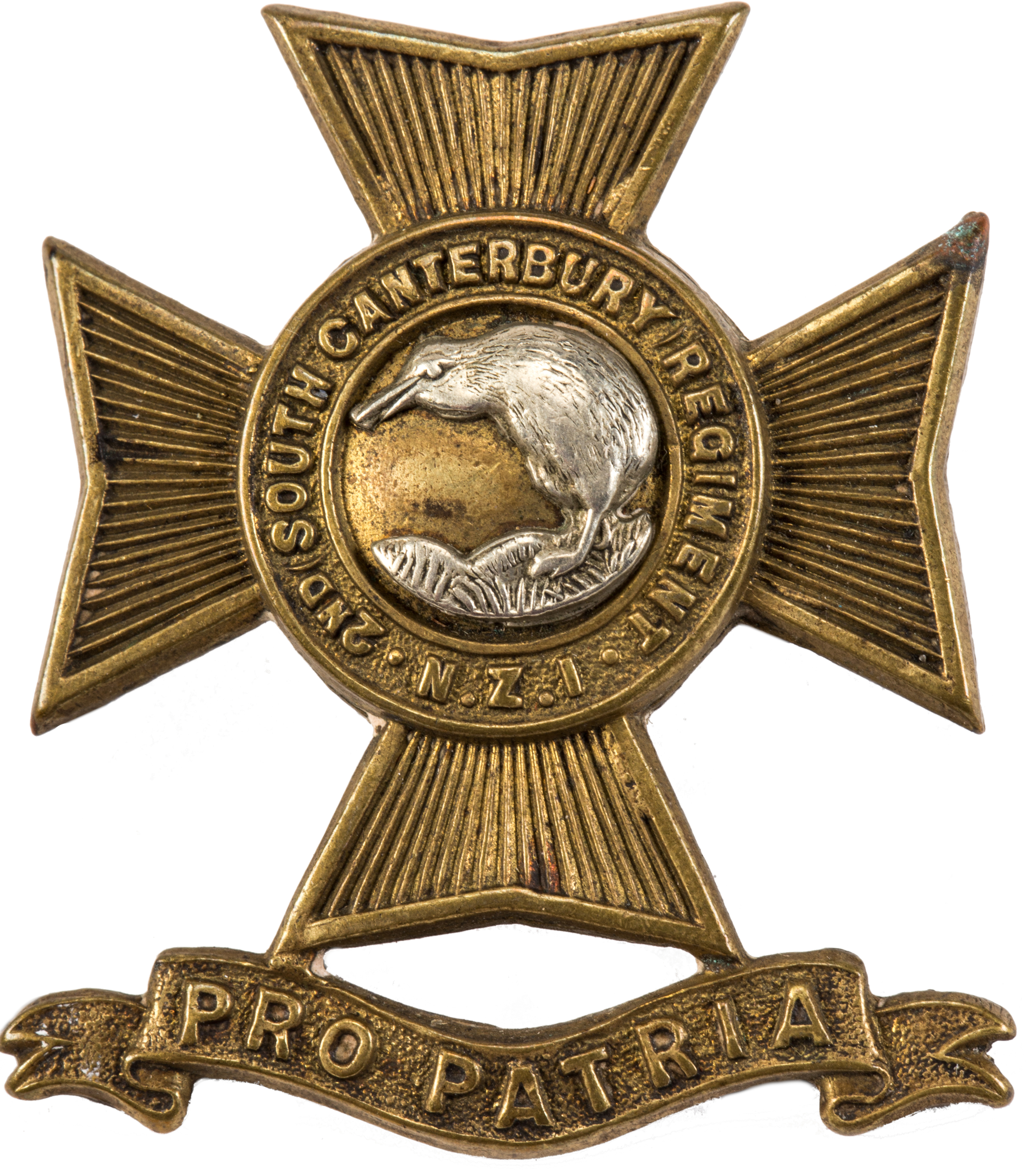
- Active: 1868-1921
- Country: New Zealand
- Allegiance: Britain
- Branch: New Zealand Military Forces
- Type: Infantry
- Motto: Pro Patria (Latin: For one's country)
- Engagements: Second Boer War; First World War

The 2nd (South Canterbury) Regiment was a territorial infantry regiment of the New Zealand Military Forces. It was formed in 1911 from various volunteer corps raised during the second half of the nineteenth century. Men from the regiment saw combat in the First World War as part of the Canterbury Infantry Regiment. It was amalgamated with the 1st (Canterbury) Regiment in 1921 to form the 1st Battalion, Canterbury Regiment.

== History ==
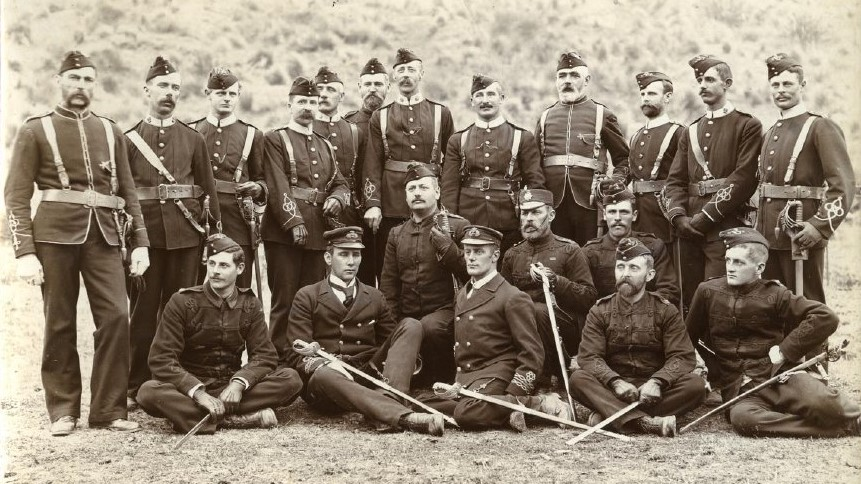
Officers of the South Canterbury Battalion at Sumner, 1898

Volunteer corps were first raised in Canterbury in 1859, although it was not until 1866 that the first South Canterbury corps, the Timaru Rifle Volunteers, was formed. The Timaru Rifles, however, did not survive long and were disbanded in 1868. In the same year, the Temuka Volunteer Rifles were raised and it is from this corps that a continuous line of service begins. Over the course of the late 19th century, a number of other South Canterbury volunteer corps were raised. In 1886 the Canterbury based corps were grouped together into the 1st Battalion, Canterbury Rifle Volunteers, although the battalion was disestablished 2 years later. Later in 1895 the rifle corps in the Canterbury Military District were once again grouped together into the Canterbury Battalion of Infantry Volunteers and in 1897 the South Canterbury corps were transferred into the newly formed South Canterbury Battalion of Infantry Volunteers. (Note: The companies of the battalion (A through H respectively) were the Tiamru City Rifles (formed as C Battery, New Zealand Artillery, converted to infantry 1897), Temuka Rifles (formed 1866), Ashburton Rifles (1879), Timaru Port Guards (formed 1866 as Timaru Artillery Corps, converted to infantry 1897), Timaru Rifles (reformed in 1885), Waimate Rifles (formed 1881), Geraldine Rifles (formed 1885, disbanded 1894, reformed 1899), Ashburton Guards (formed 1879, disbanded 1890, reformed 1899)) Men from the South Canterbury Battalion served in South Africa during the Second Boer War as part of the New Zealand Mounted Rifles Contingents. The Battalion was subsequently awarded the battle honour "South Africa 1900-1902".

The Defence Act 1909 brought about an end to the volunteer system and introduced a new territorial system of compulsory military training. It took time for the system to be implemented and in 1911 the South Canterbury Battalion of Infantry Volunteers was redesignated as the 2nd (South Canterbury) Regiment.

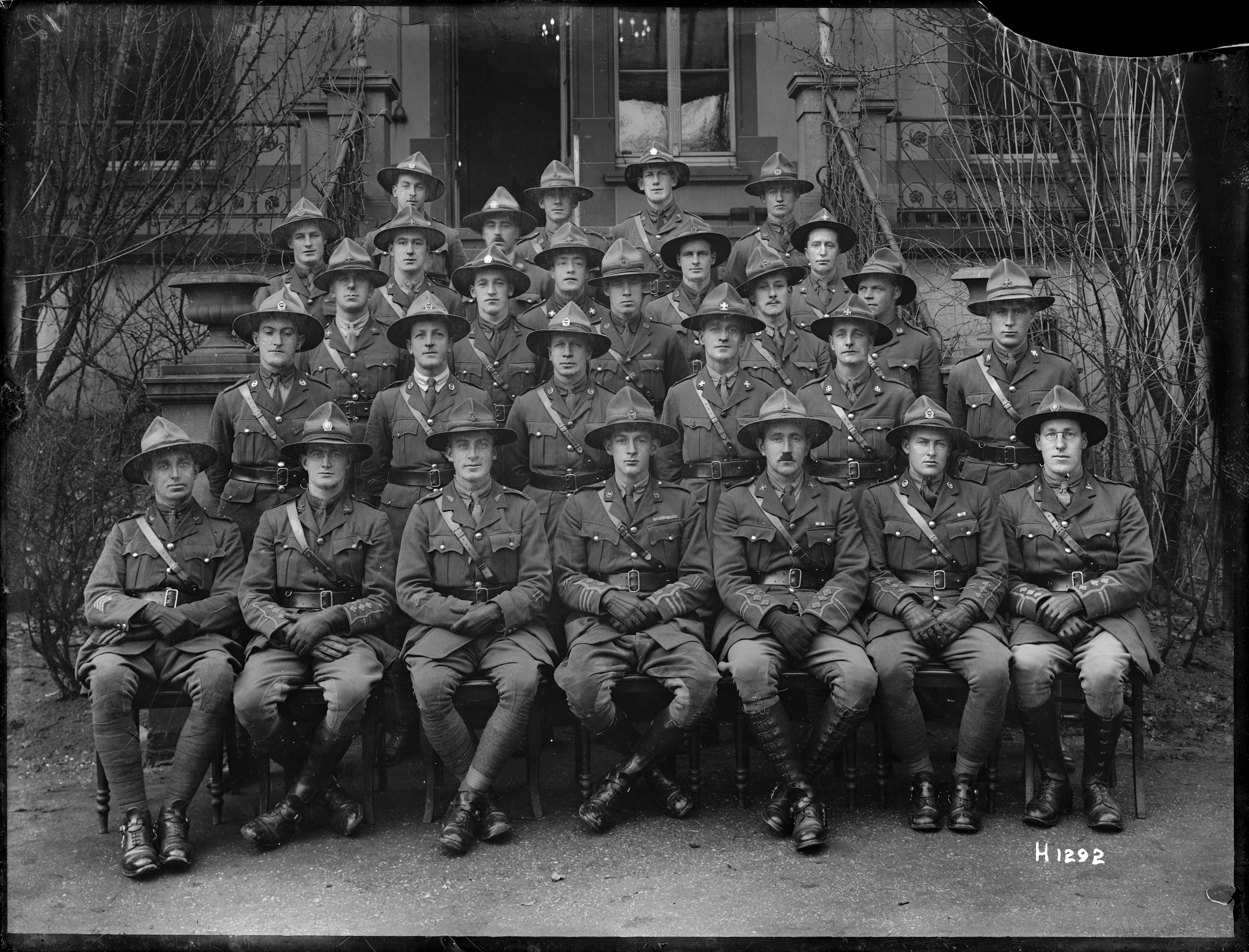
Officers of the Canterbury Infantry Regiment in Germany, 1919

At the outbreak of the First World War in August 1914, the decision was made to form a New Zealand infantry brigade of four battalions from the existing territorial regiments. Men from the 2nd (South Canterbury) Regiment formed the 2nd (South Canterbury) Company of the Canterbury Battalion, which saw service during the Gallipoli Campaign. Following the evacuation from Gallipoli in 1916, the Battalion was expanded to a regiment of two battalions. The Canterbury Infantry Regiment would see action on the western front, engaging in the battles of the Somme, Messines, Broodseinde, Passchendaele, German Spring Offensive and the Hundred Days' Offensive. A third battalion was also raised in 1917, but was disbanded in 1918 due to manpower shortages. Both the 2nd and 3rd battalions were organised along the same lines as the 1st Battalion, each with their own 2nd (South Canterbury) Company. The Canterbury Infantry Regiment was disbanded at the end of the war.

A reorganisation of the New Zealand Military Forces in 1921 saw the amalgamation of the 2nd (South Canterbury) Regiment with the 1st (Canterbury) Regiment to form the 1st Battalion, Canterbury Regiment.

== Alliances ==
- United Kingdom – Durham Light Infantry (1913–1921)

== Notes ==
Footnotes

Citations
