= Alfred Robin =

New Zealand military officer (1860–1935)

Sir Alfred William Robin
- Major General Sir Alfred William Robin
- Born: 12 August 1860; Riddells Creek, Australia
- Died: 2 June 1935 (aged 74); Wellington, New Zealand
- Military career
- Allegiance: New Zealand
- Branch: New Zealand Military Forces
- Service years: 1898–1921
- Rank: Major General
- Commands: New Zealand Military Forces
- Conflicts: Second Boer War; First World War
- Awards: Knight Commander of the Order of St Michael and St George; Companion of the Order of the Bath; Mentioned in Despatches; Légion d'honneur (France)

Major General Sir Alfred William Robin, KCMG, CB, KStJ, VD (12 August 1860 – 2 June 1935) was a New Zealand military leader.

Born in Australia, Robin's family moved to New Zealand in 1861. A coachbuilder by trade, he was active in the local militia, before becoming a professional soldier in 1899. Commander of the First New Zealand contingent that fought in South Africa during the Second Boer War, Robin later served as General Officer Commanding New Zealand Military Forces from 1914 to 1919. For his service during the First World War he was appointed a Knight Commander of the Order of St Michael and St George, and was one of only 14 members of the New Zealand Military Forces to receive the French Legion of Honour decoration during the war.

== Early life ==
Alfred William Robin was born on 12 August 1860 in Riddells Creek, Victoria, in Australia, to a baker and his wife. His family immigrated to New Zealand sometime in 1861 and settled in Dunedin, in the South Island, where his father set up a coach building business. In 1873, after completing a year of high school, Robin started working for his father and eventually became a partner in the business.

== Early military career ==
Robin had a keen interest in the military; while at school he participated in the cadet program and in 1878 joined the New Zealand Regiment of Volunteer Artillery. He later served with the Southland Hussars and the Dunedin Cavalry Volunteers, and rose to the rank of sergeant major. In 1886, the Dunedin Cavalry Volunteers became the Otago Hussars and three years later he was commissioned as a lieutenant. He was promoted to captain in 1891 and took over command of his unit. He was a highly regarded officer and his unit was one of the most efficient in the Volunteer Corps. In 1897, he was selected to lead the New Zealand contingent to Queen Victoria's Diamond Jubilee. His last command in the Volunteer Corps was as a commander of a newly formed mounted rifle battalion.

In 1899, Robin joined the New Zealand Permanent Forces as a professional soldier. He had resigned his partnership in the family business the previous year. His first posting was as an instructor to the South Island mounted rifle units and he established a tactical training school for officers. Following the outbreak of the Second Boer War, he led the first contingent of New Zealand volunteers, which numbered 215 men and their horses, to South Africa in November 1899. Further contingents would follow. While there he commanded the 1st New Zealand Regiment, which was a combined formation of the first three contingents from New Zealand. Well regarded by the British officers that he served under in South Africa, he was appointed a Companion of the Order of the Bath and mentioned in dispatches three times and on his return to New Zealand in May 1901 he became a national celebrity.

Robin was promoted to colonel and appointed commander of the Otago Military District and in 1906 he became Chief of General Staff of the New Zealand Permanent Forces (soon to be reorganised as the New Zealand Military Forces) and a member of the newly formed Council of Defence. The council recognised the need to implement compulsory military training to improve the state of New Zealand's armed forces and Robin worked to achieve this. In 1910, following the dissolution of the Council of Defence, Robin became Adjutant and Quarter-master General. In this role he worked under Major General Alexander Godley, newly appointed as Commandant of the New Zealand Military Forces. In 1912 he served overseas as New Zealand's representative in the War Office in London on the Imperial General Staff. He was appointed a Companion of the Order of St Michael and St George in the 1912 New Year Honours. Returning to New Zealand in 1913, Robin resumed duties as quarter master general.

== First World War ==
Following the outbreak of the First World War, he played a key role in preparing the New Zealand Expeditionary Force (NZEF) for service overseas. An offer to serve overseas was rebuffed as the New Zealand Government felt he was better employed on the home front. While Godley commanded the NZEF in the Middle East and France, Robin took over his duties as Commandant of the New Zealand Military Forces. He worked to ensure that the NZEF were well maintained with reinforcements and supplies, and his work in this regard was recognised by Godley who recommended that Robin be appropriately rewarded. Promoted to brigadier general in 1915, the following year he was promoted to major general and appointed a Knight Commander of the Order of St Michael and St George. His service as commandant ended in late 1919.

In recognition of his wartime service, Robin was appointed a Chevalier of the Légion d’honneur by the French President in March 1922. This French award is uncommon to New Zealanders with fewer than 100 awards made, and Robin was one of only 14 members of the New Zealand Military Forces to be decorated with the Legion of Honour during the war.

== Later life ==
Robin served as the acting administrator of Western Samoa from 1920 to 1921, retiring from the military in January 1921. In his retirement he supported a number of charitable organisations including the Boy Scouts' Association and the St John Ambulance Brigade; shortly before his death he was made a Knight of Grace of the Order of St John. A memorial shield named for Robin is awarded each year to the winning cadet team at the annual New Zealand St John Youth competition. He was president of First New Zealand Mounted Rifles' Association and was also involved with the South African War Veterans' Association of New Zealand.

He died at the age of 74 in Wellington in June 1935. Having never married, he had no children. He declined a military funeral and is buried in Wellington's Karori Cemetery.

== Notes ==
Military offices
Preceded by Major General Alexander Godley	Commandant of New Zealand Military Forces; August 1914 – December 1919	Succeeded by Major General Edward Chaytor
