= Volunteer Force (New Zealand) =

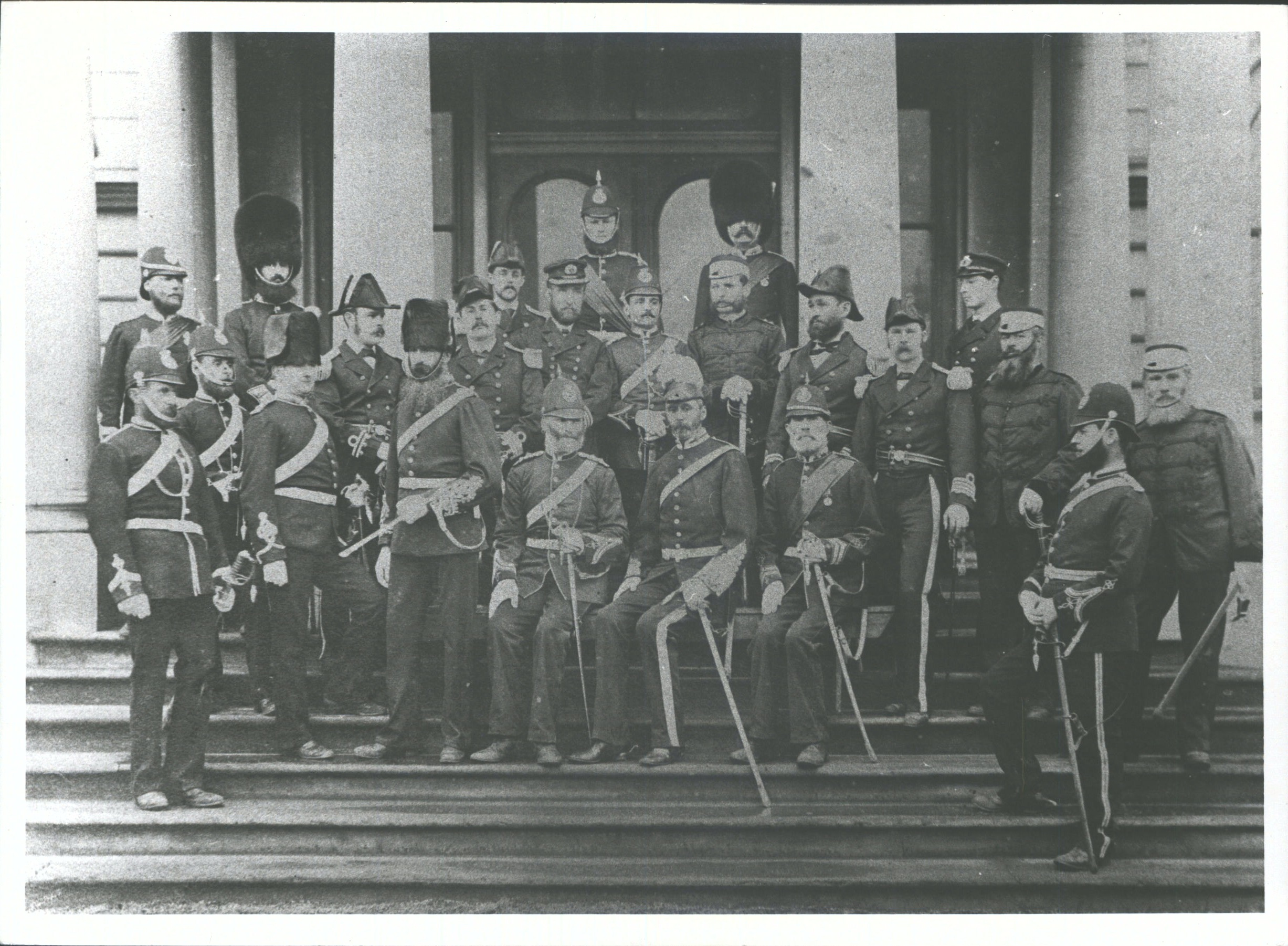
- Officers of the Wellington Volunteer District, 1905
- Active: 1865–1910
- Country: New Zealand
- Allegiance: British Empire
- Part of: New Zealand Military Forces
- Engagements: New Zealand Wars; Second Boer War

The Volunteer Force was a voluntary part time military organisation of the New Zealand Military Forces. The force provided the bulk of New Zealand's defence during the late nineteenth century and was made up of small independent corps of less than 100 men. Throughout its entire existence, the Volunteer Force was criticised for being untrained, disorganised and poorly led, with units often prioritising dress uniforms over actual military training. Despite these misgivings, units of the Volunteer Force did conduct military actions during the New Zealand Wars and the Second Boer War. In 1910 the Volunteer Force was converted into the Territorial Force. Many of the modern day units of the New Zealand Army can draw their lineages back to corps of the Volunteer Force.

== The New Zealand Wars ==
During the 1830s and 1840s, European settlers formed a number of volunteer units throughout the North Island and in Nelson in response to the fear of attack by local Māori. These units were not sanctioned by the colonial government and had no legal standing. From 1840, various British military units were stationed in New Zealand and provided the primary source of protection to European settlers. The militia act 1845 provided the governor with the power to raise a militia from local settlers in times of need. When activated, the Militia would consist of all non-Māori, male British subjects between the ages of 18 and 60. The Militia could only be utilised within 25 miles of their local police station and were intended to supplement the regular British forces in an emergency.

The militia proved to be unpopular for the settlers due to the economic dislocation caused when it was called out. Militiamen were also dissatisfied with the men appointed as officers and by the poor pay. Even the government was unhappy with the system as it struggled to cover the cost of maintaining the Militia when it was called out. The Militia Act 1845 was replaced by the Militia act 1858, which was largely identical but now provided a provision to raise units of volunteers. Unlike the Militia, however, the volunteers could be called on to fight anywhere in New Zealand.

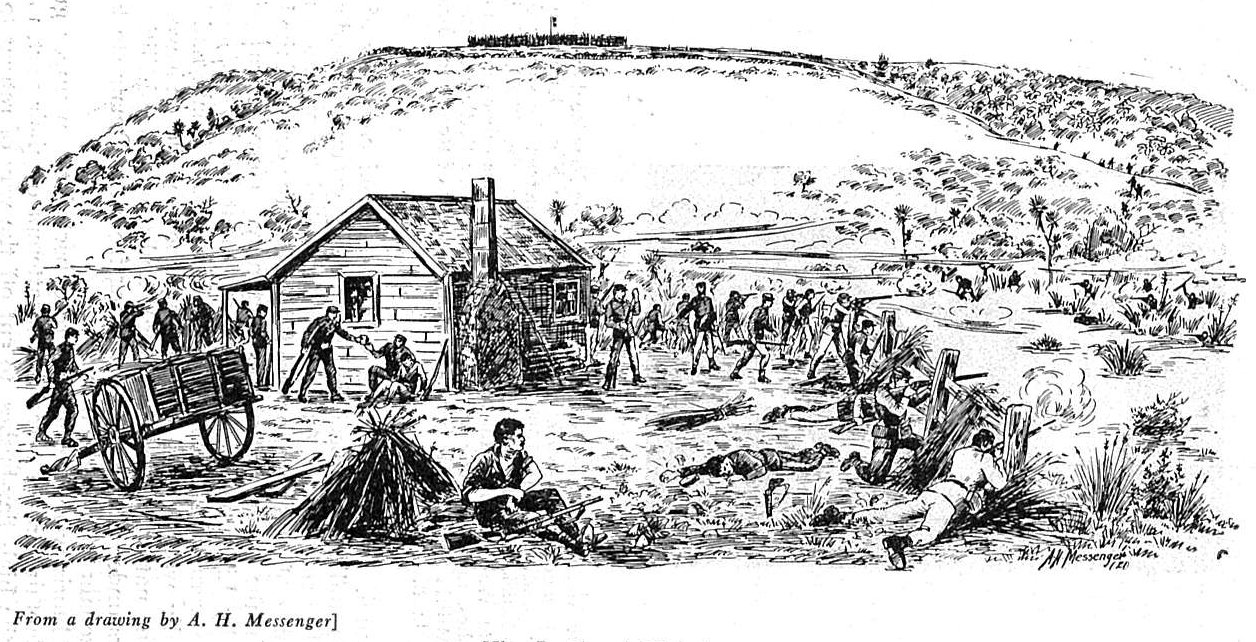
The Taranaki Rifles at Waireka, 1860

One of the first volunteer units to be raised was the Taranaki Rifles in 1859. The Taranaki Rifles were called out for active service during the First Taranaki War and fought battles with Māori at Waireka and Mahoetahi in 1860 and 1861 respectively.

In 1862, new regulations introduced required all volunteer units to disband and, if willing, reenlist. The requirement to disband was met with indignation and meant the loss of units records of service. Although many units reenlisted, there was a drop in volunteer numbers and unit seniority was reset to the date of reenlistment. In 1864 the New Zealand government adopted a self reliance policy which was intended to put more dependence on local militia and friendly Māori. Correspondingly, the Imperial Regiments began to withdraw from New Zealand in 1866, with the last regiment leaving in 1870. As part of this policy the government introduced the Volunteer Force Act 1865.

The Volunteer Force Act 1865 established the Volunteer Force and laid out a system which would largely survive until 1910. As was done in 1862, the volunteer corps were once again required to disband and reenlist under the new regulations. The volunteers had a large degree of freedom in contrast to the militia. Each corps could define its own rules concerning civil affairs, financial matters, the admission of members and could even elect their own officers. Membership of the volunteers was open, unlike the militia, to Māori and the only restraint on membership was that officers be British subjects. Basic equipment was provided by the government, although uniforms had to be provided privately, either by the volunteers themselves or at cost to the unit. Volunteers were also not paid, except for when they went on "actual service" (i.e. service during a conflict), but corps did receive an annual allowance based on the size of its membership. The government did, however, provide a major incentive to volunteers with the passing of the Volunteer Land Act 1865. Under the scheme, volunteers became qualified for a remission from the price of any land purchased from the crown. The remission was valued at £30 after a total of five years service, but a further £5 could also be acquired for ever six months of active service.

Both the unit allowance and the land price remission was reliant on volunteers being "efficient" (i.e. suitably trained and able to perform their duties). Training of the volunteers, however, was irregular with no explicit guidelines. The corps commander set the standards for what constituted being efficient in their corps, even though they might not themselves be competent to make such a decision. The problem was troubled further by the fact that, as an elected role, the commanders position was reliant on their popularity with the men.

The 1865 Act was also the first time that a volunteer corps was explicitly defined. A corps was to consist of either: a troop or company of artillery, a troop of cavalry, a company of engineers, a Rifle Company, a company of Naval Volunteers or a Fire Brigade. Each corps was required to maintain a minimum membership or face being disbanded, likewise an upper limit on size was also applied. The exact size requirements varied through the existence of the Volunteer Force, but corps were generally constrained to be between around 40 to 100 men.

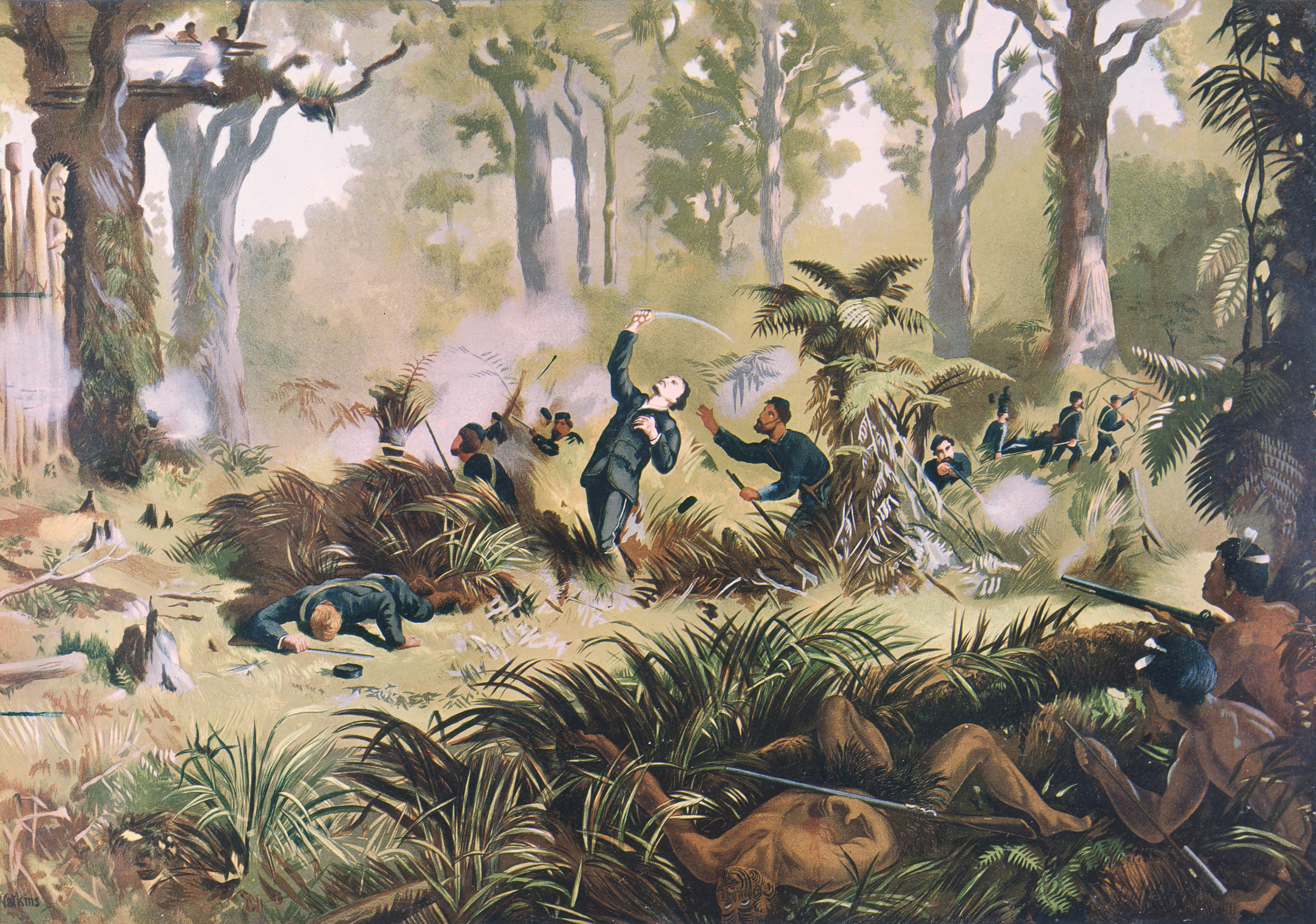
The Forest Rangers at Te Ngutu o te Manu, 1868

Throughout the late 1860s Volunteer units were called out to garrison forts and support British Army units during conflict with Māori. The Taranaki Rifles were involved in a number of actions during the Second Taranaki War, while the Auckland Coastguards (later known as the Auckland Naval Artillery) and Gustavus von Tempsky's Forest Rangers saw action in the Invasion of the Waikato. During Tītokowaru's War (1868-1869) a force of 350 Volunteers and armed constabulary, including the Forest Rangers, Wellington Rangers, Wellington Rifles, and the Patea Yeomanry Cavalry were defeated at Te Ngutu o Te Manu. The inexperienced volunteers of the Wellington Rifles did not perform well, some of whom fled from the battle in panic.

The Volunteer Force was relatively inactive during the 1870s and was only occasionally utilised for civil matters such as dealing with public disorder, fighting fires and providing a lifeboat service. In 1881, however, a force of 1600 volunteers and armed constabulary were called up to arrest Te Whiti o Rongomai at Parihaka. Te Whiti had led a campaign of passive resistance to land confiscations by the New Zealand Government. The volunteers and armed constabulary arrested Te Whiti, destroyed the village and dispersed much of its population.

== The Russian scares ==
By the 1880s the fear of conflict with Māori had decreased, but was replaced by concerns of a Russian Invasion. In 1873 The Daily Southern Cross published a report that the Russian Cruiser Kaskowiski (cask of whisky) had sailed into Auckland harbour and seized gold and hostages. The report was a hoax, but added to a growing fear of war with Russia. A more substantial "Russian scare" occurred in 1878 when Britain nearly went to war with Russia due to conflict with the Ottoman Empire. The scare prompted a surge in volunteering and led New Zealand to review its defences, in particular with regards to coastal fortifications. Colonel Peter Scratchley of the Royal Engineers, who had already advised the Australian Colonies on their defence, was commission to report on the Defences of New Zealand in 1880. His report suggested the installation of various coastal guns, torpedo batteries and mine installations. Scratchley was also critical of the organisation of the Volunteer Forces describing it as "fatal to military efficiency". He proposed the formation of larger naval brigades to man the coastal fortifications and the implementation of a more rigorous training regime. A further review of the volunteer system in 1882 suggested disbanding the current force and reforming it with substantial changes. Military districts should be reduced in size and corps formed into larger administrative regiments. The report also advised removing the provision that officers be elected, providing stricter rules on the process of promotion and establishing an officer training school. The report, however, proved to be politically unpopular and was not implemented.

In 1885 Russia invaded Afghanistan. The Treaty of Gandamak required Britain to support Afghanistan in the event of aggression by a foreign power and it looked like Britain might go to war with Russia. Although Britain did not honour the treaty, the resulting Russian scare led to renewed concern over the colonies defence. Sir George Whitmore was promoted to major general (the first New Zealand officer to hold the rank) and appointed commandant of the New Zealand Defence Forces. Whitmore introduced a higher level organisation of Volunteer Force and, between 1885 and 1887, grouped the individual corps together into administrative infantry battalions and mounted regiments. A school of military instruction was also established, but was poorly attended, with only six students in 1886 and 1887. Despite Whitmore's innovations, by the late 1880s the Volunteer Force was perceived as being excessive in size and too expensive. New Zealand was in the midst of an economic depression and in 1887 the Government invited Major General Henry Schaw to review the colony's defence, with a focus on reducing expenditure as much as possible. Schaw determined that as the Māori were no longer a threat, internal defence was unnecessary and efforts should be focused on coastal protection. Rural-based volunteers were of little value and only corps based in the four main harbours (Auckland, Wellington, Lyttelton and Dunedin), and to a lesser extent some of the smaller ports, were needed to repel potential landing forces. Shaw's report was accepted in 1888 and saw a halving of the size of the Volunteer Force. Whitmore resigned without replacement and his school and battalion organisations were disbanded.

== Expansion and the Second Boer War ==
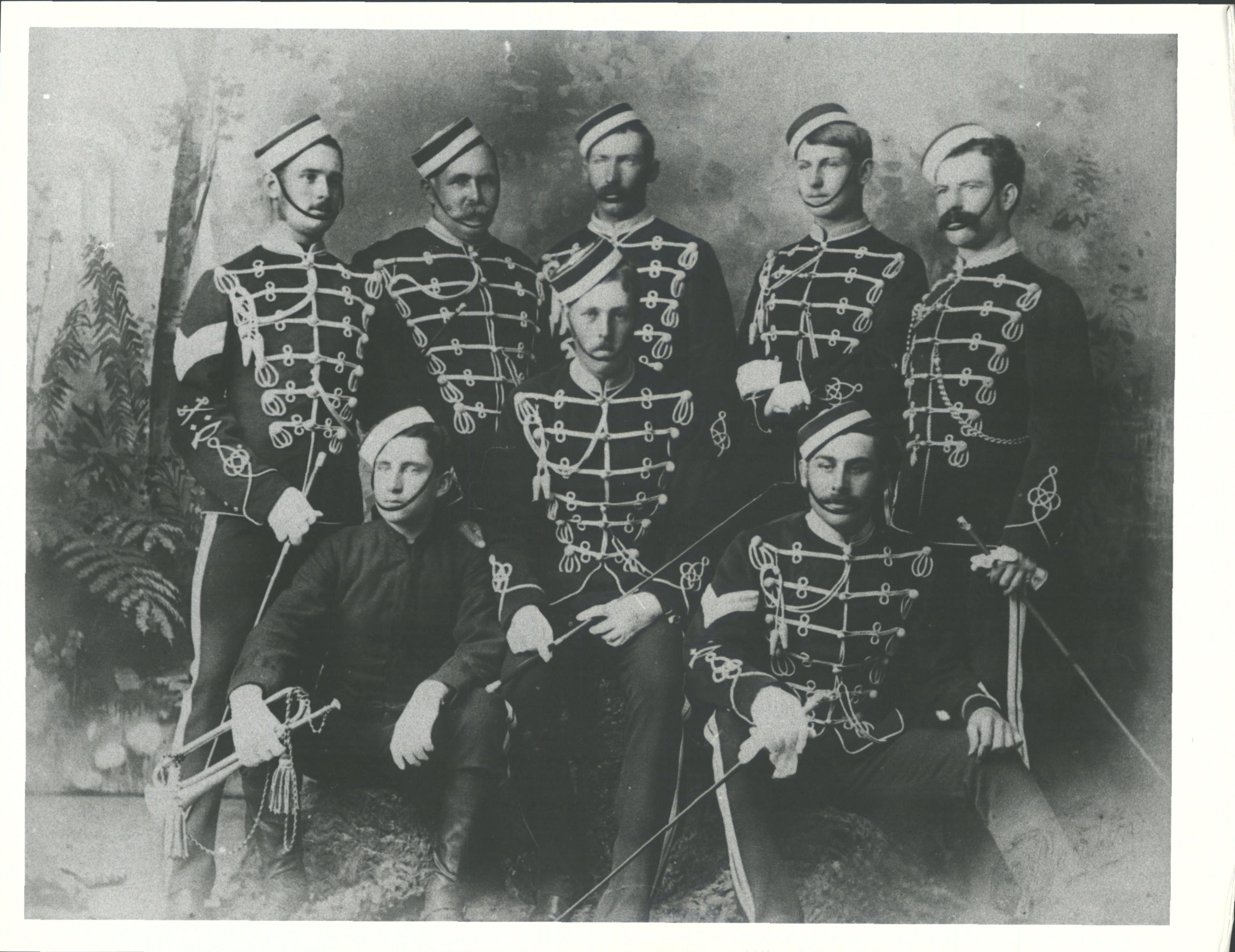
The Otago Hussars (pictured) were the only volunteer corps, of the 133 inspected in 1893, considered to be adequately trained.

A liberal government was elected in 1891 and Richard Seddon, as Minister of Defence and later Prime Minister, sought to revitalise the Volunteer force. Lt Col Francis Fox was asked to report on the state of the volunteer force. Fox's report was published in 1893 and was condemning of the Volunteer Force. Of the 133 corps inspected, Fox considered that the Otago Hussars was the only corps in an effective state and "which possesses any knowledge of the cavalry work which is in reality essential". The drill and instruction provided to volunteers was out of date and instructors were overworked. Volunteers required more training and in particular needed to experience field training away from the drill hall. Fox was also critical of the shortage and poor quality of weapons, equipment and uniforms. Fox proposed large scale disbandment of inefficient corps, and the dismissal of around a quarter of the officers, who he considered "indifferent or bad". Although Fox was open to the idea of election of officers, he argued that officer candidates should be subject to a rigorous examination procedure to ensure quality. Most of this advice was not implemented, although in 1895 the government did implement some of the suggested higher level reorganisation. The 14 military districts were reduced to five (Auckland, Wellington, Canterbury, Otago and Nelson-Westland) and the corps were once again organised into administrative battalions and regiments.

The volunteer force saw a major revitalisation in 1897 with the celebration of Queen Victoria's Diamond Jubilee. Volunteering also expanded greatly in 1899 with the out break of the Second Boer War. Although no individual volunteer corps was sent to South Africa, New Zealand did send ten contingents of mounted rifles. These contingent were formed from volunteers of all corps, and were not exclusive to mounted volunteers.

== Conversion to the Territorial Force ==
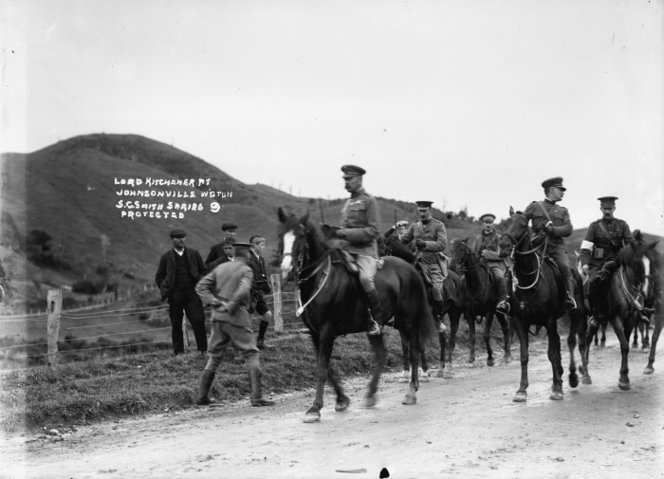
Lord Kitchener during his inspection tour of New Zealand, 1910

In the late 1900s New Zealand had become increasingly wary of the increased threat of Germany, in particular as a naval power. The question of compulsory military training was being increasingly raised and the quality of the volunteer force was, as in the past, under scrutiny. At the Imperial Defence Conference of 1909, Prime Minister Joseph Ward agreed that in the event of war New Zealand would provide an expeditionary force of units organised along the same lines as the British Army. The Volunteer Force was not compatible with this commitment and upon Ward's return to New Zealand, the Defence Act 1909 was presented to parliament and passed in two weeks.

The Defence Act 1909 reorganised the country into four military districts, each with, among other support units, three mounted rifle regiments, four Infantry battalions and a brigade of artillery. Implementation of the new act was postponed until a review was complete by Lord Kitchener. Kitchener toured New Zealand in early 1910, but only suggested minor changes to the proposed act. The Territorial Force came into being on 28 February 1910 and brought an end to the Volunteer Force. In 1911 the battalions were redesignated as regiments and the identities of the old individual volunteer corps were superseded by a regimental one. The seniority of the new regiments was determined by the most senior volunteer corps within the regiment. Only the reenlistment dates under the 1865 Volunteer Force Act were considered and this was met with discontent by some units which claimed to have a longer lineage.

== Uniforms ==
Volunteer corps were required to provide their own uniform and were generally able to define the pattern worn, at least within the styles of uniforms worn by the British Army of that period. Some units adopted the uniforms of British Units such as the Wellington Guards, which wore the uniform of the Grenadier Guards, and the Wellington Highland Rifles, which adopted the Seaforth Highlanders' uniform. From 1900 a Khaki field service uniform was introduced, although the full dress uniforms remained popular.

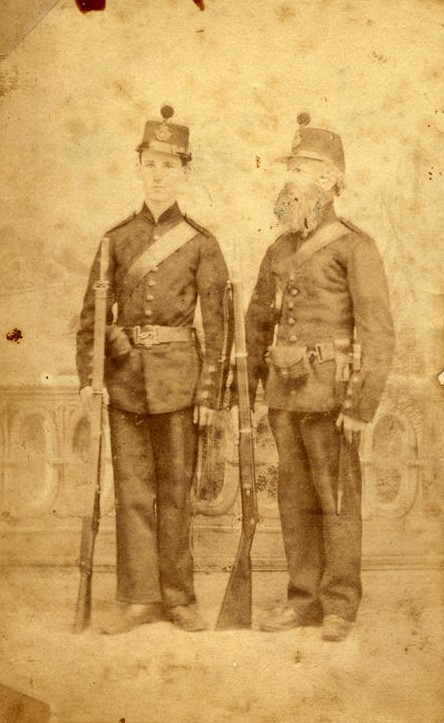
Taranaki Volunteer Rifles, 1868

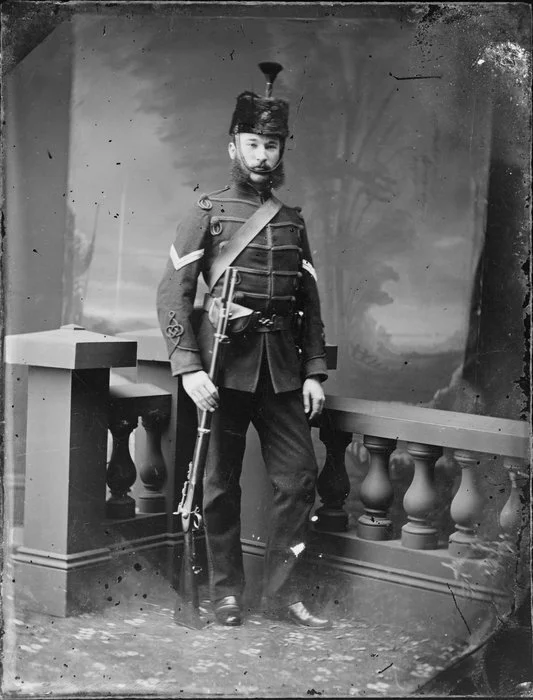
Wanganui Rifle Volunteer, c.1870

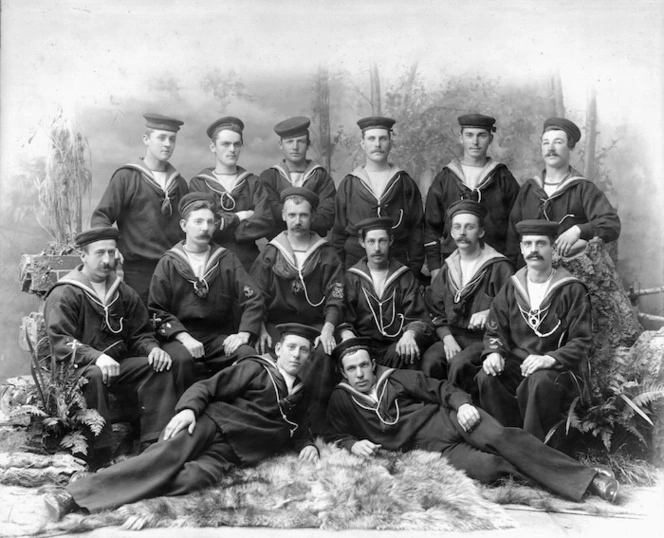
Wellington Naval Artillery Volunteers, 1898

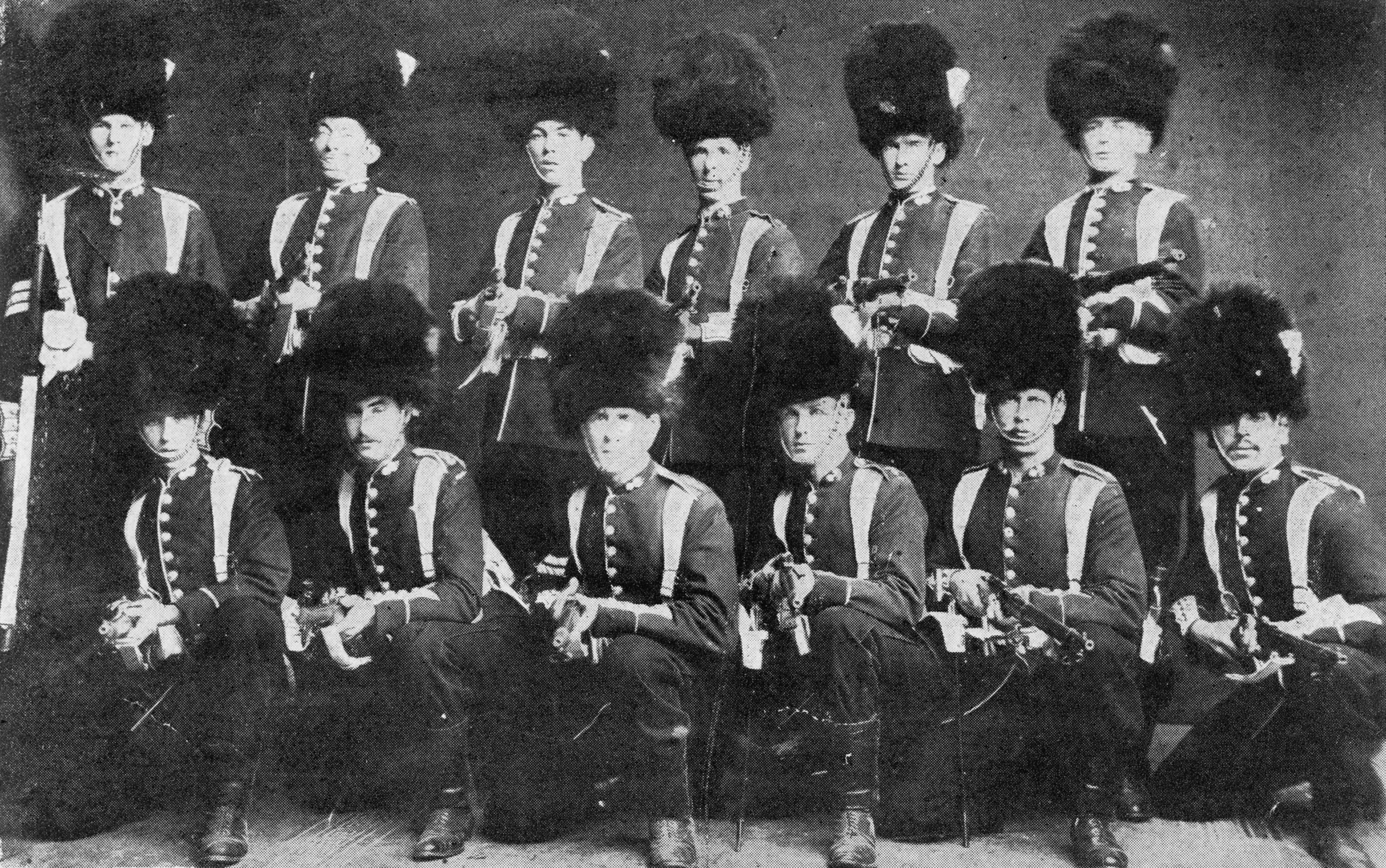
Wellington Guards, 1900

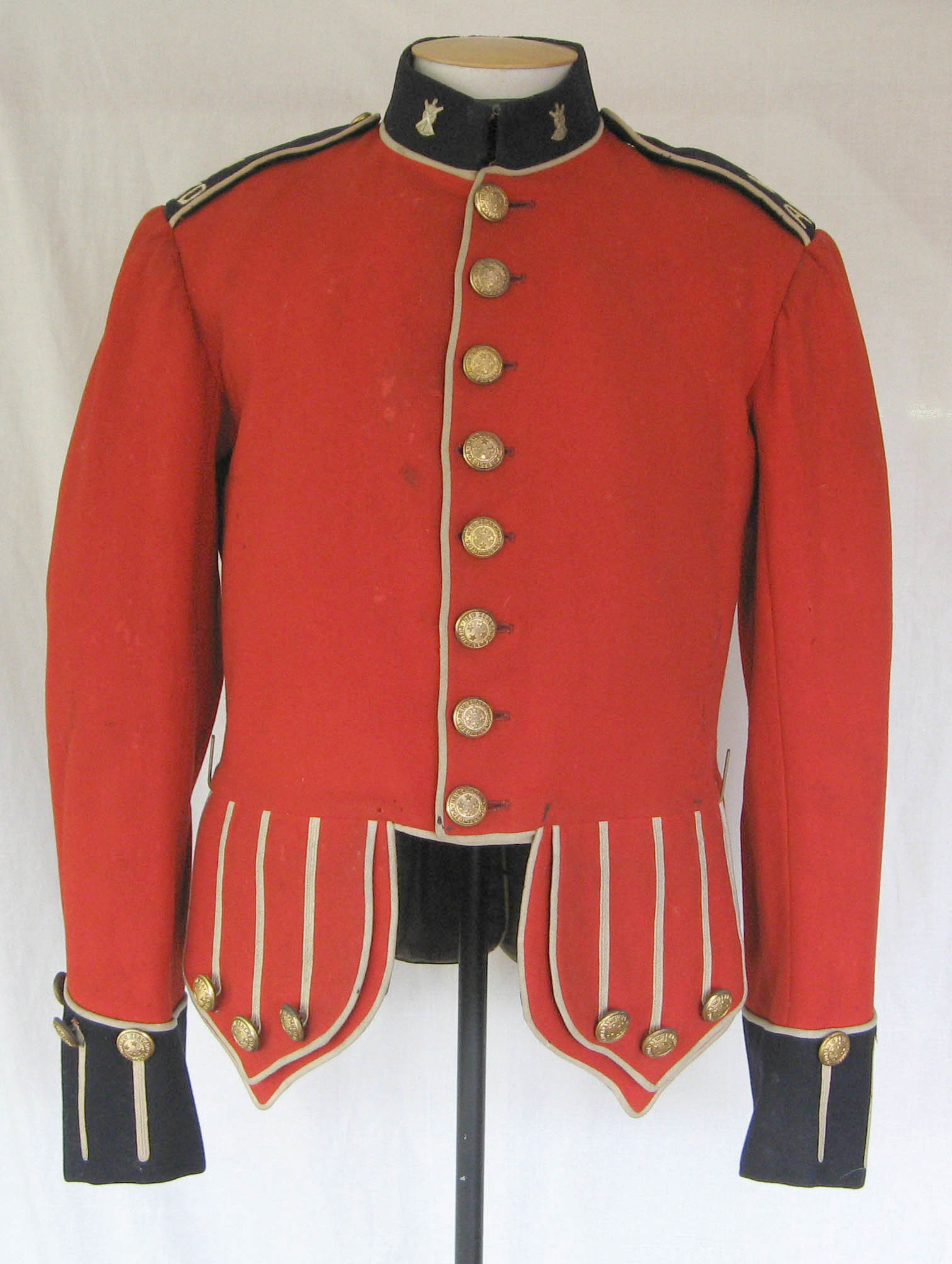
Doublet of the Auckland Rifle Volunteers, c. 1900

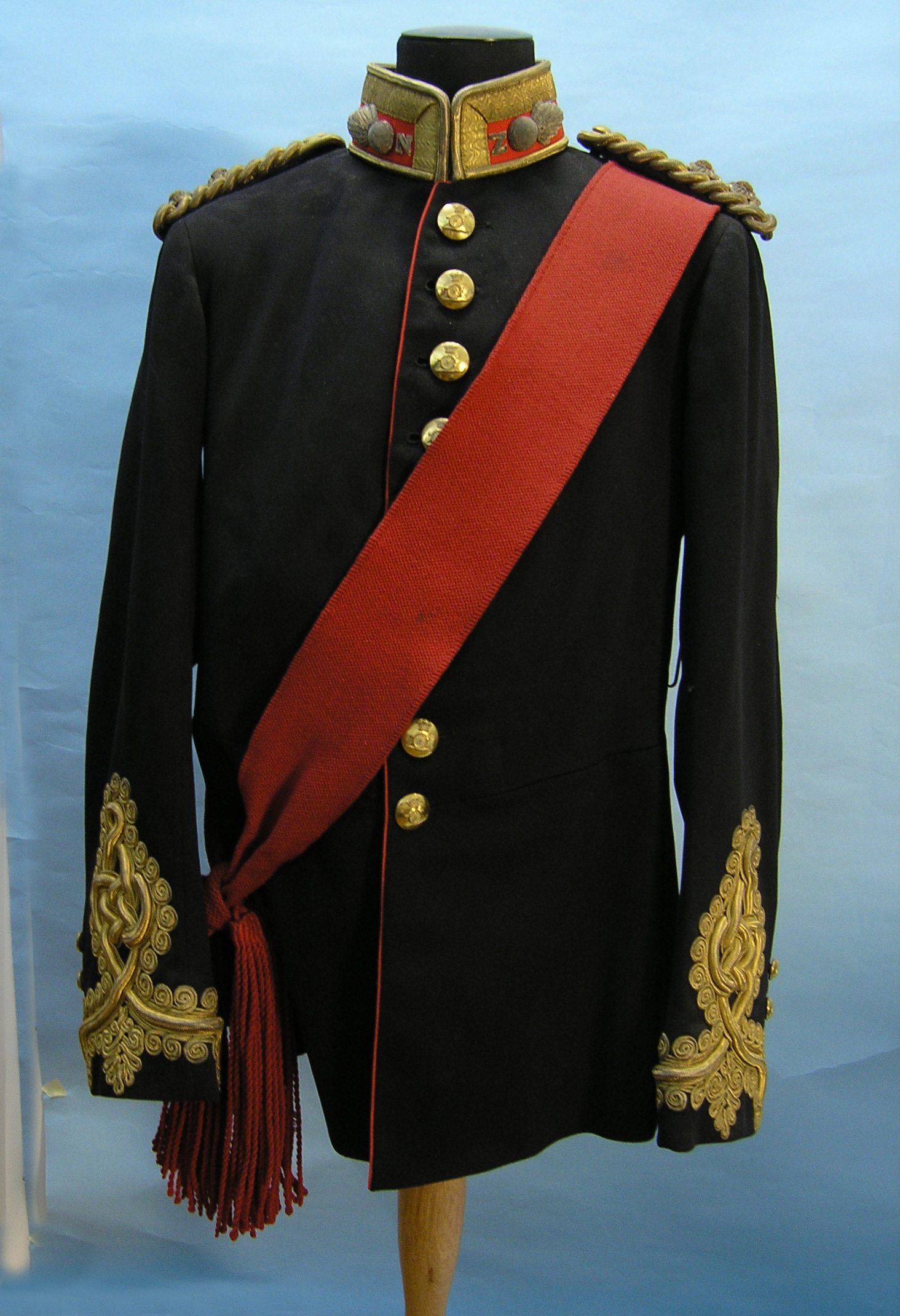
Tunic of the New Zealand Coastguard Artillery Volunteers, c. 1898

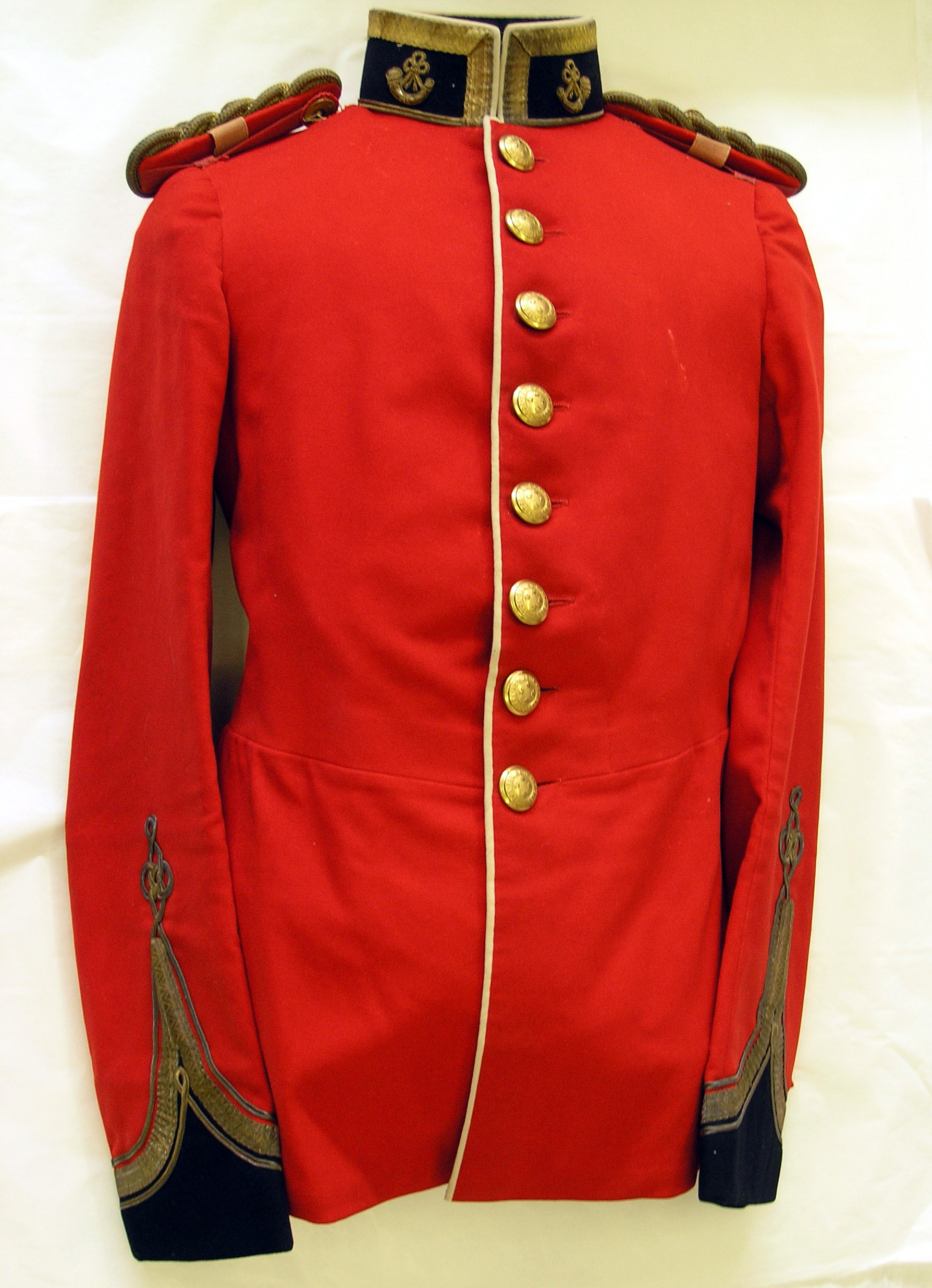
Tunic of the Victoria Rifle Volunteers, c. 1900

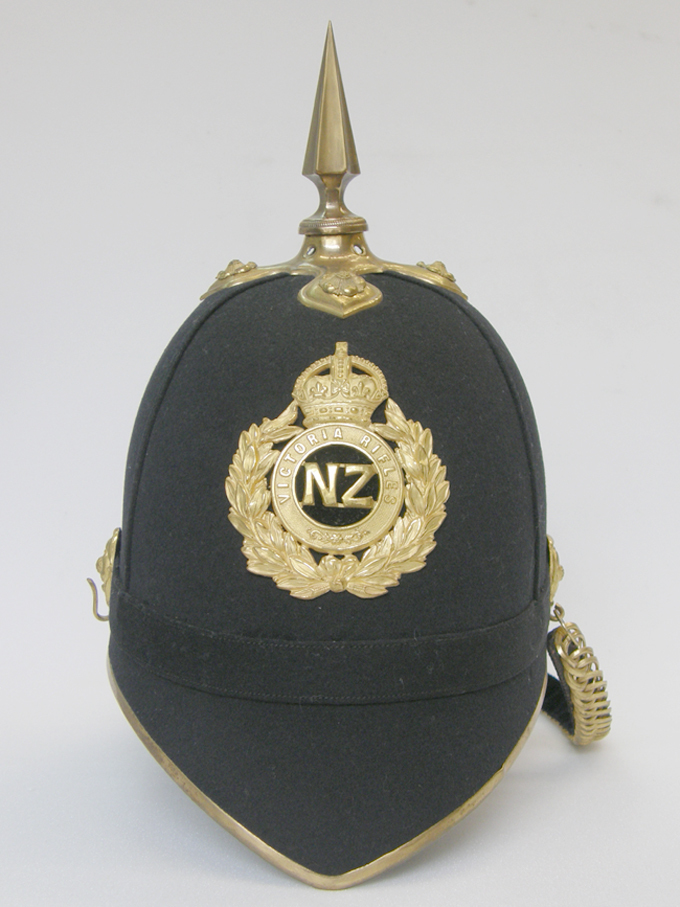
Helmet of the Victoria Rifle Volunteers, c. 1900

== Strength ==
The size of the Volunteer Force varied greatly throughout its existence, both due to the growth of the colony and due to historical events. It experienced large periods of growth during the New Zealand wars in the 1860s, the Russian scares of the 1880s, and during the Second Boer War in the early 1900s.

Year	Number of Volunteers	Number of Corps
1858	233	2
1859	426	3
1860	1216	35
1861	1314	43
1862	1481	24
1863	1229	58
1864	2418	69
1865	4498	78
1866		68
1867	3779	75
1868		104
1869	6158	109
1870	5407	118
1871	6568	132
1872	6042	132
1873		132
1874		106
1875		95
1876		89
1877		85
1878	5058	88
1879	8032	118
1880		110
1881	7133	114
1882	8318	96
1883	6828	85
1884	4332	86
1885	7919	138
1886	8253	146
1887	8029	149
1888	8064	140
1889	7776	121
1890	6700	111
1891	6582	107
1892	6368	102
1893	5667	90
1894	6443	85
1895	5288	84
1896		85
1897	5121	91
1898	4500	116
1899	7000	121
1900	11444	212
1901	17057	221
1902	15391	224
1903	13934	224
1904	13061	224
1905	12867	215
1906	13165	215
1907	13384	215
1908	13049	212
1909	12625	211
