= List of New Zealand units in the Second Boer War =

New Zealand Division
- Active: 1899–1902
- Country: New Zealand
- Allegiance: British Crown
- Branch: New Zealand Army
- Type: Mounted infantry
- Engagements: Second Boer War

New Zealand contributed ten contingents of mounted rifles towards the British Crown's efforts in the Second Boer War (also known as the South Africa War). The British Government accepted the offer by Richard Seddon – the Premier of New Zealand – for troops, and so the country became the first British colony to volunteer forces for the war. A total of ten contingents departed for South Africa between October 1899 and April 1902. The volunteers of the first two contingents were mainly members of New Zealand's existing permanent or voluntary forces and were expected to supply their own equipment and horses. The Third and Fourth Contingents were organised by regional politicians and businesspeople: the Third organised mainly from Canterbury, and the Fourth from Otago. These two Contingents were also largely paid for through local fundraising rather than central government, and together they became known as the Rough Riders. The remaining contingents were funded by the British Government. The Boer War was the first overseas conflict to involve New Zealand troops, and was the first conflict the nation was involved in since the New Zealand Wars had ceased in the early 1870s. Over 6500 New Zealand soldiers served in South Africa with the units suffering 230 casualties – most of those from either accident or disease.

== Contingents ==
New Zealand units of the Second Boer War
Name	Departed	Strength	Commander	Notes
First Contingent	21 October 1899 from Wellington	215	Major Alfred William Robin	
Second Contingent	20 January 1900 from Wellington	266	Major Montagu Cradock	Included a Hotchkiss machine gun detachment
Third Contingent	17 February 1900 from Lyttelton	262		
Fourth Contingent	24 March 1900 from Port Chalmers; 31 March 1900 from Lyttelton	462	Colonel Frederick Wyatt Francis (Canterbury); Major Joe Sommerville (North Island)	Divided into four Companies: 7th and 8th from the North Island, 9th and 10th from Otago and Southland
Fifth Contingent	31 March 1900 from Wellington and Lyttelton	591	Lieutenant-Colonel Stuart Newall	
Sixth Contingent	30 January 1901 from Auckland	602	Lieutenant-Colonel Joseph Henry Banks	
Seventh Contingent	6 April 1901 from Wellington	667	Lieutenant-Colonel Thomas William Porter	
Eighth Contingent	1 February 1902 from Auckland; 8 February 1902 from Lyttelton	1120	Colonel Richard Hutton Davies	Divided into two regiments: North Island and South Island
Ninth Contingent	12 March 1902 from Port Chalmers; 20 March 1902 from Auckland	1071		Divided into two regiments: North Island and South Island
Tenth Contingent	14 April 1902 from Wellington; 19 April 1902 from Lyttelton	1251		Divided into two regiments: North Island and South Island

== See also ==
- Military history of New Zealand
- List of Second Boer War Victoria Cross recipients

== External sources ==
- Embarkation database with every New Zealand soldier who joined the New Zealand contingents
