= Compulsory military training in New Zealand =

Compulsory military training (CMT), a form of conscription, was practised for males in New Zealand between 1909 and 1972. Military training in New Zealand had been voluntary before then and has been ever since.

== Origins ==
=== Colonial era ===
Calls for the military training of settlers began in the colony's earliest days. The concern was that settlers were not used to firearms, which could result in their inability to defend themselves if the need arose. Debate continued until 1843, when a militia was formed in Wellington, without the Governor's authorisation, which prompted the Governor to send troops to Wellington to disperse the militia.

There was further debate, and in March 1845, the Militia Ordinance 1845 was passed by the legislature and enabled the Governor to form a militia when required. Training would be implemented only when the militia was needed. The ordinance required:

Every man except as hereinafter excepted, between the ages of (18) years and (60) years, being a British subject, and not an aboriginal native, who shall reside within the colony, shall be liable to serve in such militia....

Those exempted under clause 7 were "Judges of the Supreme Court, all members of the Legislative Council, all clergymen, priests, ministers of religion, and catechists". In addition under Clause 9

the Police Magistrate shall have power, after hearing such objections, to strike out of the said list the names of all persons who shall not be liable to serve as militiamen, and also of such as are afflicted by lunacy or unsoundness of mind, or deafness, blindness, lameness, or by any other disorder that may render them unfit for active service in any such militia...".

The first significant use of this legislation was at New Plymouth in 1858, when 400 residents were called up. On 28 May 1858, the Militia Act 1858 replaced the ordinance, but retained the same provisions as the above clauses. Monetary penalties were introduced for not complying with the call-up.

As a result of the land wars commencing in the early 1860s, the Act was replaced in 1865 by the Militia Act 1865. The new Act changed the requirement to register by reducing the maximum age from 60 to 55 and by including all males who had resided in New Zealand for more than three months. The list of exempted professions was expanded, with the militia being classified into three levels of priority, ranging from unmarried men and widowers without children, between eighteen and forty years of age; widowers with children, and married men, between 18 and 41 years of age, unmarried men who could prove that female relatives were dependent upon them for their support; and men between 40 and 55 years of age. Penalties for failing to comply with the Act became considerably tougher, with reference to penalties under Imperial legislation.

The 1865 Act was repealed and replaced by the Militia Act 1870. The exempted professions were slightly amended, the starting age was lowered from 18 to 17 and the classifications for levels of priority changed to solely age groups: 17 to 30 years, 30 to 40 years and 40 to 55 years. Penalties in the Act remained mainly fines.

=== Russian scare to World War I ===
With the Russian Scare of the 1880s, the Militia Act was repealed, and the Defence Act 1886 set up a permanent military force. The changes relating to the militia expanded those liable for service to include Maori, slightly revised the exempted professions and revised the priority classifications by making those married and aged either 17 to 30 or 30 to 40 one step lower priority than those who were single.

In the late 1880s, people such as Lord Wolseley in England and reported in New Zealand, began to make calls for the universal compulsory military training of young men. Switzerland was held up as an example of the success of such a system. Debate quietened down until the Second Boer War, when the issue again began to be raised in the press. In 1903 to 1904, a Royal Commission considered New Zealand's defence needs and concluded that all able-bodied males should be trained in the use of arms.

In 1905, the Australasian National Defence League was formed in Australia, with the intent to introduce universal compulsory military training for youths and men on the Swiss system. The proposal differed from the earlier militia in that training was to be organised permanently rather than just when required. The Australian move was widely reported in New Zealand at the time. In 1906, the National Defence of New Zealand organisation was set up with similar objectives. The organisation advocated the compulsory training of all boys and youths up to the age of 21. By 1907, Australia had begun to move towards compulsory military training despite opposition from trade unions, socialist parties and others. Legislation was introduced into the Australian Parliament in September 1908. During the New Zealand 1908 election campaign, Prime Minister Sir Joseph Ward stated that he was against forcing compulsory military training on the populace.

== Introduction of universal compulsory military training ==
=== Defence Act 1909 ===
Ward appears to have changed his mind because in April 1909, he announced that the government intended to introduce compulsory military training for youths up to 21 years old. There was some sporadic opposition to the idea, but that was very definitely a minority view. In Wellington, there was quite pronounced opposition from socialists. The Society of Friends raised the issue of conscientious objectors with Ward.

The Defence Act 1909, Section 35, brought in a general training requirement for males 12 to 14 years old (Junior Cadets), 14 to 18 (Senior Cadets), 18 to 21 (General Training Section), and 21 to 30 (the Reserve). There was exemption for religious conscientious objectors under Section 92 of the Act but only subject to performing non-combatant duties within the military. Failure to comply with the Act could result in fines and potentially imprisonment for those who did not pay them. The Act also introduced a range of new offences, a number of which were aimed at the behaviour of those being trained. The Defence Amendment Act 1912 repealed Section 35 (a) and thereby removed the requirement for those aged up to 14 years old to be trained.

There continued to be mixed opposition to the Act, such as Methodists seeking a broader conscientious objection clause and the Tinsmiths and Sheetmetal Workers Union seeking removal of the compulsory requirements. Anti-militarists, such as Reginald Williams of the Passive Resisters Union, and the National Peace Council also spoke out against compulsory training. They were all very much in the minority of public opinion since conscientious objectors were generally perceived as shirkers. Political opposition to the measures came from the socialists and Federation of Labour.

=== World War I ===
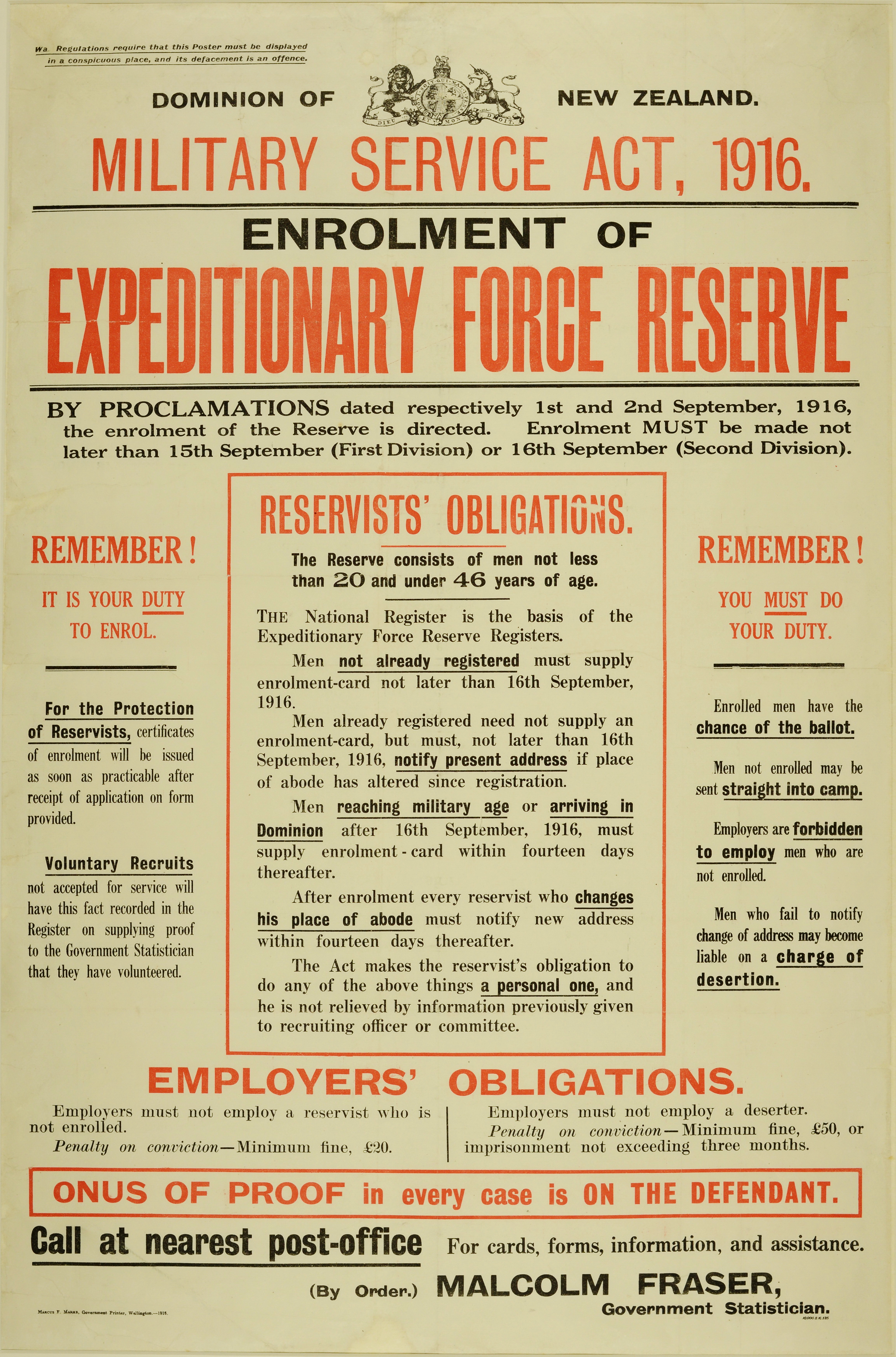
Conscription poster

Public opinion had tended to harden against conscientious objectors as World War I approached, as the derisive term "conchies" emerged. Alternative service suggested by the government was generally rejected by the public in favour of punishment and imprisonment. In 1915 Britain began to move towards conscription, but New Zealand thought the need unlikely. By early 1916, Great Britain had introduced conscription, and debate in New Zealand papers was generally overwhelmingly in favour of following suit. Those opposing it were considered unpatriotic and shirkers by the general public. However, it is hard to tell what public opinion truly was, as sedition charges were laid against those who expressed a contrary view and deserters and their employers were pursued and given harsh punishments. That attitude was reflected with the introduction of conscription in 1916 in the Military Service Act 1916, which from 16 September 1916 imposed a liability on all men from the 20th birthday up to the day before the 46th birthday to be entered in a ballot for military call-up.

The only grounds for conscientious objection were:

That he was on the fourth day of August, nineteen hundred and fourteen, and has since continuously been a member of a religious body the tenets and doctrines of which religious body declare the bearing of arms and the performance of any combatant service to be contrary to Divine revelation, and also that according to his own conscientious religious belief the bearing of arms and the performance of any combatant service is unlawful by reason of being contrary to Divine revelation.

That was a considerable contraction of the exemption under the Defence Amendment Act 1912, which had allowed under Section 65(2):

On the application of any person a Magistrate may grant to the applicant a certificate of exemption from military training and service if the Magistrate is satisfied that the applicant objects in good faith to such training and service on the ground that it is contrary to his religious belief.

Only Christadelphians, Seventh-day Adventists and Quakers were recognised as conscientious objectors under the 1916 legislation. The combined number of males within those religions was only about 1,200. Only 20 to 30 of them were exempted military service.

The only political opposition to conscription in Parliament came from five members of parliament and trade unions. Five Labour Party members (Fraser, Semple, Armstrong, O'Brien, and Webb) were imprisoned for their opposition to conscription.

Of the 124,211 New Zealand men who served during World War I, 91,941 were volunteers and 32,270 were conscripts.

=== Number of compulsory military trainees during war ===
Year	Territorials	Senior Cadets	General training	Rifle clubs
1911–12	22,614	–	–	–
1912–13	23,919	24,770	1,370	4,003
1913–14	25,902	25,332	3,729	2,577
1914–15	29,447	26,446	2,075	8,770
1915–16	26,839	27,063	3,437	7,928
1916–17	22,174	29,832	–	7,975
1917–18	22,933	30,668	–	7,252
1918–19	25,626	31,109	–	6,354

=== Prosecutions ===
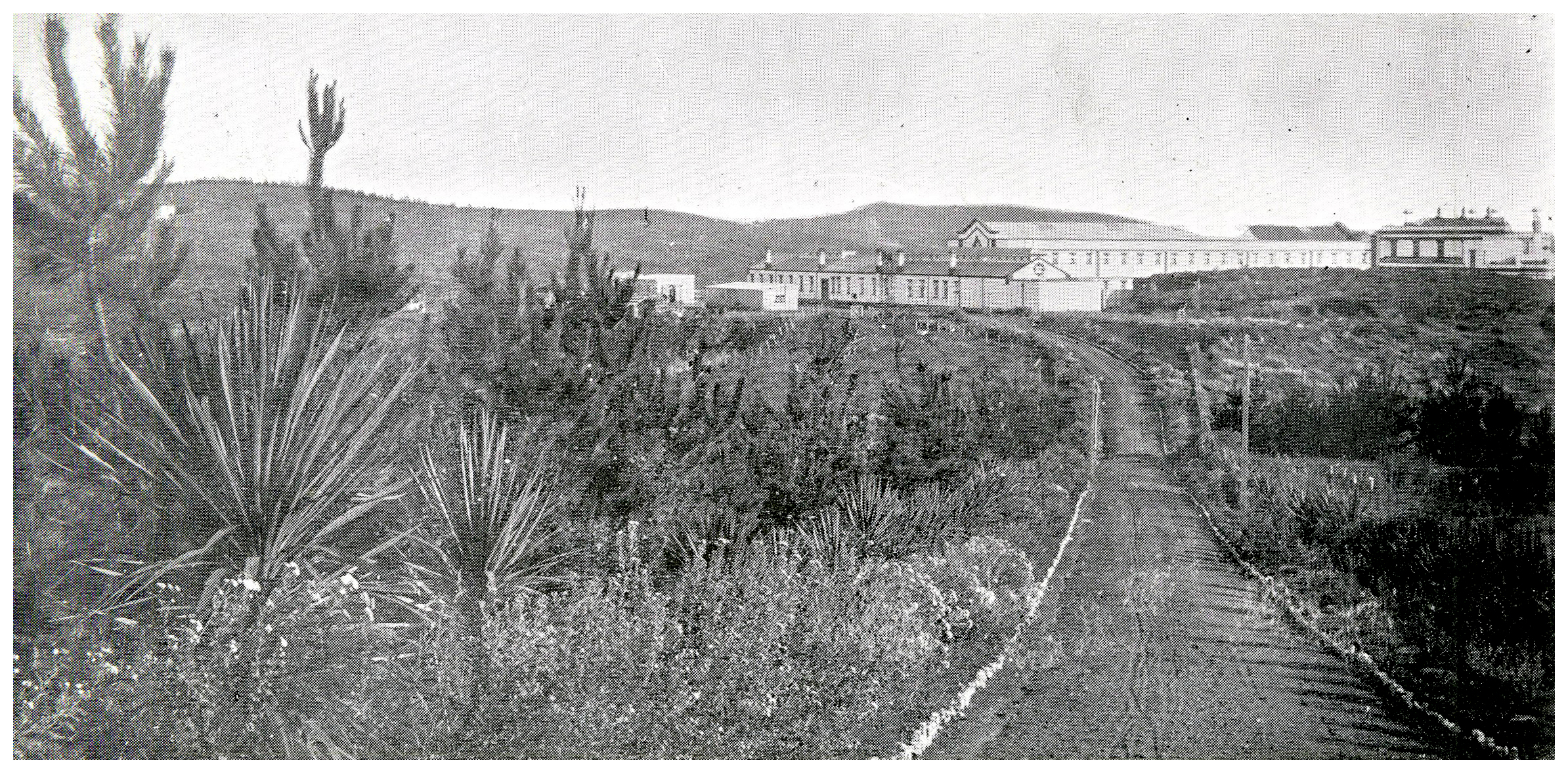
Waikeria Prison, where at least 64 objectors were held until 1919

The numbers of prosecutions for breaches relating to compulsory military training and military service were 28 in 1911, 3,187 in 1912, 7,030 in 1913, 6,321 in 1914, 3,136 in 1915, 2,478 in 1916, 2,342 in 1917 and 1,501 in 1918. In addition to prosecutions under the Act, some local authorities implemented by-laws to prohibit the distribution of anti-compulsory military training leaflets.

=== Abolition ===
The compulsory military training provisions of the Defence Act were placed in abeyance in 1930 because of the Great Depression. From July 1931, voluntary training was inaugurated. During that period, high school students were subjected to a few periods each week of military training.

In May 1939, a voluntary military reserve was established in response to the looming crises in Europe.

=== World War II ===
During World War II, difficulties in filling the Second and Third Echelons for overseas service in 1939 and 1940 and the Allied disasters of May 1940 led the government to reintroduce conscription reluctantly in June 1940 by the National Service Emergency Regulations on 18 June, made under the Defence Act and the Emergency Regulations Amendment Act of 31 May. Men aged between 18 and 46 again became liable to be called up by ballot. Volunteering for Army service ceased from 22 July 1940 although entry to the Navy and Air Force remained voluntary. From January 1942, workers could be manpowered, or directed to essential industries.

Four members of the cabinet, including Prime Minister Peter Fraser, had been imprisoned for anti-conscription activities in World War I, the Labour Party was traditionally opposed to it, and some members still demanded conscription of wealth before men.

Conscientious objection was allowed under the legislation if the applicant could prove to the satisfaction of the Appeal Board that he had objected on conscientious grounds before the outbreak of war. Only 200 cases were approved, with 800 being imprisoned for failing to comply with the regulations. A total of 194,000 men served in the armed forces during the war.

== Postwar ==
=== 1949 referendum ===
On 25 May 1949, Prime Minister Peter Fraser announced that a referendum would be held on the future of CMT. The results on 3 August 1949 strongly approved reintroduction of CMT, with 77.9% in favour and a turnout of 63.5%.

Choice	Votes	%
For	568,427	77.9
Against	160,998	22.1
Invalid/blank votes		-
Total	729,245	100
Source: Nohlen et al.

=== After referendum ===
Under the Military Training Act 1949, which went into effect in 1950, all males became liable for military service upon reaching 18 years of age. They were required to register with the Department of Labour and Employment, and apart from those exempted for medical, compassionate or conscientious objection reasons, they had to undergo 14 weeks of intensive full-time training, three years of part-time service and six years in the Reserve. All had the option of serving with the Royal New Zealand Navy, the New Zealand Army or the Royal New Zealand Air Force. A total of 63,033 men were trained before the Military Training Act was replaced by the Labour Party government's National Service Registration Act 1958 early that year.

In March 1961, a National Party government, under Keith Holyoake, ended the registration of 18-year-olds for national service. A new act, the National Military Service Act 1961, was introduced requiring all males to register on their 20th birthday with the Department of Labour. Ballots based on dates of birth were conducted to decide who would undertake compulsory service. Those selected were required to complete three months initial full-time training, followed by an annual commitment of three weeks part-time training for three years.

The issue of compulsory military training became a point of debate in the 1960s as New Zealand contributed a combat force to the Vietnam War. Unlike Australia or the United States which sent conscripts, New Zealand only sent full-time professional regular force soldiers but anti-war protests also included calls to abolish CMT and the Organisation to Halt Military Service (OHMS, a pun on both resistance and "On Her Majesty's Service") mounted a campaign of civil disobedience and lobbying. Members refused to do military service or deserted military camps. One of the deserters Geoff Woolford was jailed. In 1972 a newly-elected Labour government, led by Norman Kirk, ended National Service.

== Today ==
Since 1972 there has been no conscription. There have been sporadic calls for its reintroduction, especially as a measure to reduce youth crime, but no major political party has made it part of its platform.

== See also ==
- Conscription in Australia

WWI

- Conscription Crisis of 1917 in Canada
- Recruitment to the British Army during the First World War
- World War I conscription in Australia
