= Keith Lindsay Stewart =

New Zealand military leader

Sir Keith Lindsay Stewart
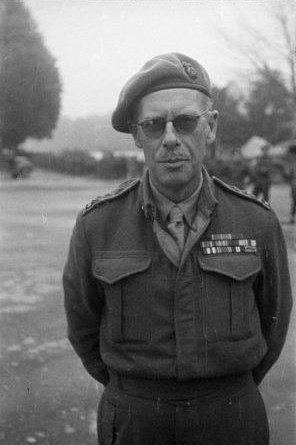
- Stewart, pictured here when he was a brigadier, in Florence, Italy, 1944
- Born: 30 December 1896; Timaru, New Zealand
- Died: 13 November 1972 (aged 75); Kawakawa, New Zealand
- Spouse: Rita
- Military career
- Allegiance: New Zealand
- Branch: New Zealand Military Forces
- Service years: 1914–54
- Rank: Major General
- Commands: Chief of the General Staff (1949–52); 9th Infantry Brigade (1945–46); 5th Infantry Brigade (1943, 1944); 4th Armoured Brigade (1943–44)
- Conflicts: First World War; Sinai and Palestine campaign; Second World War; Battle of Greece; Italian campaign
- Awards: Knight Commander of the Order of the British Empire; Companion of the Order of the Bath; Distinguished Service Order; Mentioned in Despatches (2); Officer of the Legion of Merit (United States); Military Cross (Greece)

Major General Sir Keith Lindsay Stewart, KBE, CB, DSO (30 December 1896 – 13 November 1972) was a professional soldier in the New Zealand Military Forces. He served during the First and Second World Wars and was Chief of the General Staff of the New Zealand Military Forces from 1949 to 1952.

Born in 1896 in Timaru, New Zealand, he joined the New Zealand Military Forces in 1914 as a cadet and served with the New Zealand Expeditionary Force from 1916 in the Middle East for the last two years of the First World War. After the war he held a number of staff positions in New Zealand and abroad. He saw active service during the Second World War as part of the 2nd New Zealand Division. He was made a prisoner of war in August 1944 and spent most of the final months of the war in captivity in Germany. After the war he commanded J Force while it was engaged in occupation duties in Japan. While Chief of General Staff, he oversaw the deployment of New Zealand's military personnel to Korea to assist the United Nations during the Korean War. He retired from the military in 1954 and died in Kawakawa, in 1972.

== Early life ==
Keith Lindsay Stewart was born in Timaru, South Canterbury on 30 December 1896. His father, David Stewart, was a bank manager. He had a stutter and was educated at Napier Boys' High School and then Wanganui Collegiate.

== Military career ==
In 1914, Stewart entered the Royal Military College, Duntroon in Australia, having passed its entrance exams. He graduated early to volunteer for the New Zealand Expeditionary Force (NZEF) in 1916.

=== First World War ===
Stewart did not embark for the Middle East until June 1917. Most of his war service was in Egypt, where he was the adjutant of the New Zealand Training Units and Depots there. He also spent a period of time with the headquarters of the Australian and New Zealand Mounted Division, which was serving in the Sinai and Palestine campaign. By the end of the war, he had been promoted to captain and was appointed a Member of the Order of the British Empire for his services. He returned to New Zealand in December 1919 and his service with the NZEF was terminated.

=== Interwar period ===
After arriving back in New Zealand, Stewart joined the New Zealand Staff Corps. After serving as a staff officer, firstly to the commandant of the New Zealand Military Forces and then in the Central Military District, he attended the Staff College at Camberley, England, for several years. In 1931, he was seconded to the Ceylon Defence Force, where he spent three years as a staff officer. He returned to New Zealand in 1934 and was made an Officer of the Order of the British Empire for his services in Ceylon. He held staff positions in Southern Command, the military district that covered the South Island of New Zealand, until 1939.

=== Second World War ===
Following the outbreak of the Second World War in September 1939, Stewart was posted to Army Headquarters in Wellington, with responsibility for training and staff duties. Now a lieutenant colonel, he was seconded to the Second Expeditionary Force (2NZEF) in late 1939 and embarked for the Middle East in early 1940 as General Staff Officer for the 2nd New Zealand Division. He worked closely with Major General Bernard Freyberg, the divisional commander during the Battle of Greece. After the end of the campaign in Greece, most of the division, including Stewart and Freyberg, was evacuated to Crete. Here, Stewart was promoted to brigadier and served with Creforce as Freyberg's Brigadier General Staff. His services on Crete were recognised with the Distinguished Service Order.

Stewart returned to New Zealand in late 1941 to take up an appointment as deputy chief of staff, firstly under Major General John Duigan and then Lieutenant General Edward Puttick. His poor health was also a factor in his return. He assisted in preparations to defend New Zealand against an attack by the Japanese Empire. He remained in this position for 18 months before returning to the 2NZEF in August 1943 as commander of the 5th Infantry Brigade.

Stewart commanded the brigade through the early stages of the Italian campaign before handing over responsibility to Brigadier Howard Kippenberger in November 1943. Stewart then took over command of the 4th Armoured Brigade while its nominal commander, Brigadier Lindsay Inglis, was on furlough in New Zealand. When Kippenberger became temporary commander of the 2nd New Zealand Division, Stewart returned to the 5th Infantry Brigade as its commander. He led the brigade through the Battle of Monte Cassino and up until early August 1944, when he was captured by German forces while visiting the front line. He was held in Germany as a prisoner of war until March 1945, when his camp was liberated by Allied Forces. He was mentioned in despatches twice during the course of the war as well as being awarded the United States Legion of Merit and the Greek Military Cross.

=== Postwar career ===
Appointed a Commander of the Order of the British Empire in the 1945 Birthday Honours, Stewart returned to New Zealand in July 1945. He commanded the 9th Infantry Brigade from October to July 1946. The brigade was originally based in the Middle East, but in early 1946 moved to Japan as part of J Force, New Zealand's contribution to the British Commonwealth Occupation Force (BCOF). After Stewart's period in command ended he returned to New Zealand and was appointed adjutant general of the New Zealand Military Forces. The following year, he was appointed a Companion of the Order of the Bath in the 1947 New Year Honours.

In April 1949, Stewart replaced Major General Norman Weir as Chief of the General Staff, New Zealand Military Forces. He reestablished compulsory military training and advanced plans for the government's commitment to deploy military forces to the Middle East in the event of hostilities with the Soviet Union. This led to a clash with Prime Minister Sydney Holland in 1950 over the rate of progress of these plans for which he later apologised. He also oversaw the deployment of New Zealand forces to Korea following the outbreak of the Korean War.

== Later life ==
Stewart retired from the military in 1954 but, in a break with convention, he was not rewarded with a knighthood for his services. This was most likely due to his previous clashes with Holland. He was knighted as a Knight Commander of the Order of the British Empire four years later by the newly elected Labour Government in the 1958 Queen's Birthday Honours.

He retired to Northland and died at the age of 76 in the small town of Kawakawa on 13 November 1972. He was survived by his wife Rita, who he had married in 1922, and the couple's two children. He is buried in the servicemen's section of Wellington's Karori Cemetery.

== Notes ==
Military offices
Preceded by Major General Norman Weir	Chief of the General Staff; April 1949 – March 1952	Succeeded by Major General William Gentry
