= William Gentry =

New Zealand military leader (1899–1991)

Sir William George Gentry
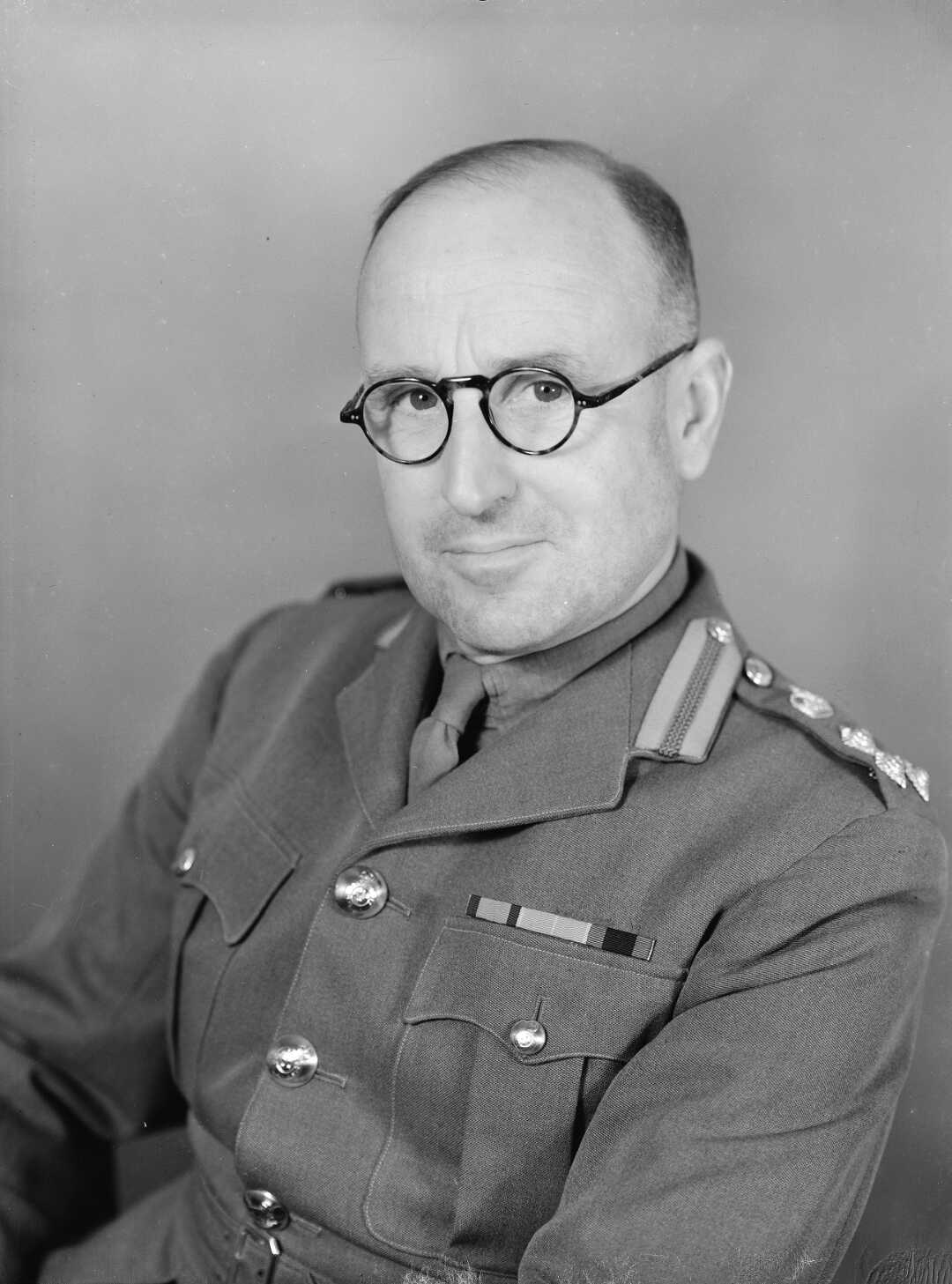
- Born: 20 February 1899; London, England
- Died: 13 October 1991 (aged 92); Lower Hutt, New Zealand
- Military career
- Allegiance: New Zealand
- Branch: New Zealand Military Forces
- Service years: 1919–55
- Rank: Major General
- Service number: 40002
- Commands: Chief of the General Staff (1952–55); 9th Infantry Brigade (1945); 6th Infantry Brigade (1942–43)
- Conflicts: North-West Frontier; Second World War; Battle of Greece; Battle of Crete; Western Desert campaign; Italian campaign
- Awards: Knight Commander of the Order of the British Empire; Companion of the Order of the Bath; Distinguished Service Order & Bar; Mentioned in Despatches (2); Military Cross (Greece)

Major General Sir William George Gentry, KBE, CB, DSO & Bar (20 February 1899 – 13 October 1991) was a professional soldier in the New Zealand Military Forces who served during the Second World War. He was Chief of the General Staff of the New Zealand Military Forces from 1952 to 1955.

Born in 1899 in London, United Kingdom, Gentry's family emigrated to New Zealand in 1910. He joined the New Zealand Military Forces in 1916 as a cadet. Following graduation from the Royal Military College in 1919, he was posted to the New Zealand Staff Corps and held a number of staff positions in New Zealand and abroad. He saw active service during the Second World War as part of the 2nd New Zealand Division, initially as a staff officer but later on as a brigade commander. After the cessation of hostilities in 1945 he held senior staff positions in the New Zealand Military Forces. From 1952 Gentry served as Chief of the General Staff until his retirement in 1955. He died in 1991 in Lower Hutt.

== Early life ==
Gentry was born in London on 20 February 1899 to Frederick Gentry, a leather salesman, and his wife, Eliza née Lawson. When he was 11 years old, his family emigrated to New Zealand, settling in Wellington. Educated at Wellington College, he was one of the limited number of New Zealand entrants in 1916 who enrolled in the Royal Military College at Duntroon in Australia.

== Military career ==
Gentry graduated from Duntroon in 1919 and was posted to the New Zealand Staff Corps. He was seconded to the British Indian Army for two years, serving on the North-West Frontier during the Waziristan campaign and the Moplah rebellion. On returning to New Zealand, he held a number of staff positions in the Central Military District and was promoted to captain in 1926. In 1934 he was sent to England on attachment to the Corps of Royal Engineers for 18 months and also attended engineering courses. He then served at General Headquarters in Wellington as staff officer, Engineers, before returning to England to attend the Staff College at Camberley, graduating in 1939.

=== Second World War ===
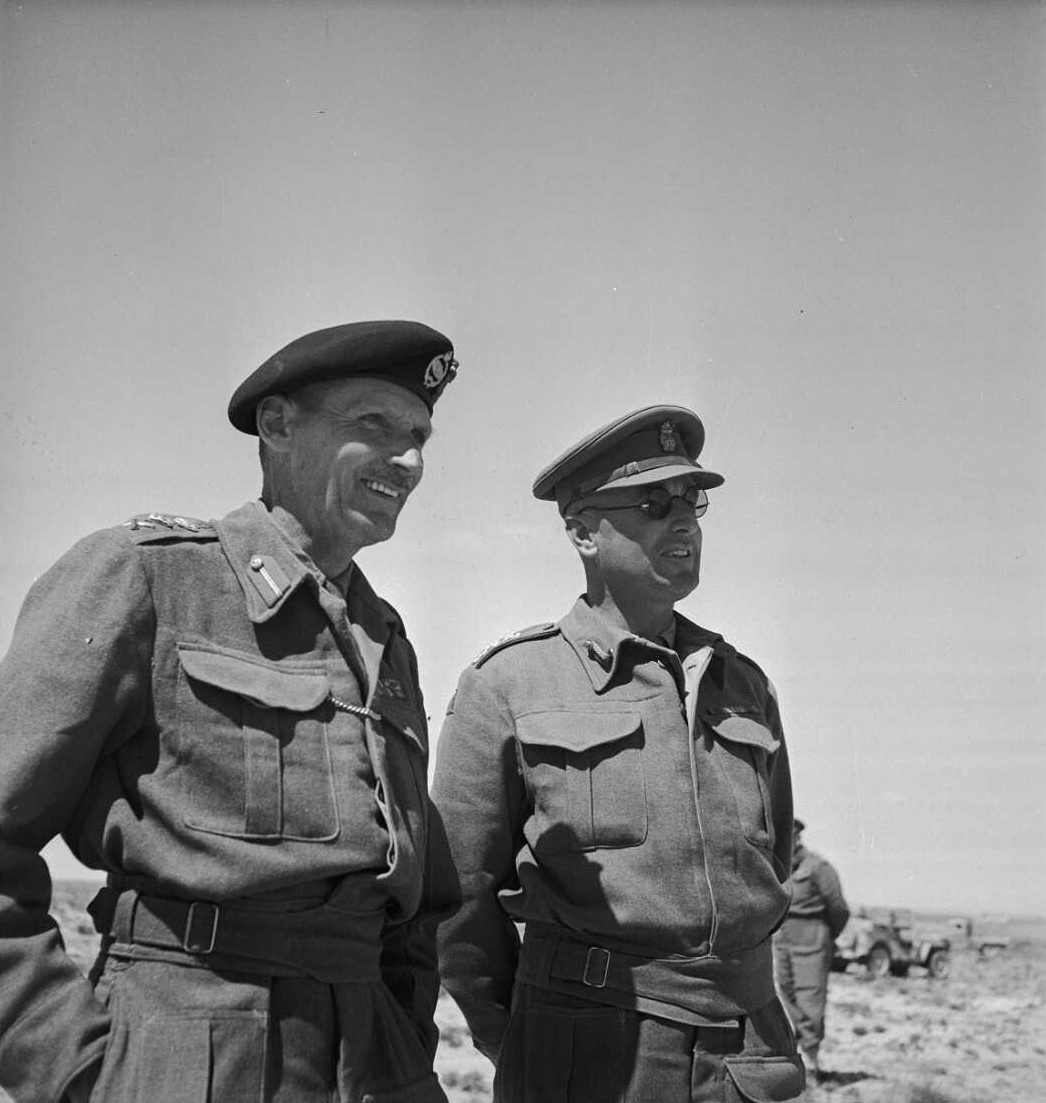
General Bernard Montgomery and Brigadier William Gentry (right) in Tunisia during the Second World War

Shortly after the outbreak of the Second World War, Gentry was promoted to major. He briefly served with the British Expeditionary Force in France before traveling to Egypt to join the Second New Zealand Expeditionary Force (2NZEF). Promoted to lieutenant colonel, he served as assistant adjutant and quartermaster general of the 2nd New Zealand Division during the Battle of Greece. In the Battle of Crete he was acting general staff officer (GSO1) in the stead of Brigadier Keith Stewart, who was fulfilling an equivalent role with Creforce. Gentry performed his duties competently and was in the 1942 New Year Honours appointed Officer of the Order of the British Empire (OBE) for his services during this time. He was also, much later, awarded the Greek Military Cross.

In October 1941, after the departure of Stewart to take up the position of Deputy Chief of Staff in New Zealand, Gentry became GSO1 of the 2nd New Zealand Division. In this role, he served under Major-General Bernard Freyberg, who commanded the division, and developed a relationship where he could question Freyberg "without arousing impatience or irritation". He earned a Distinguished Service Order (DSO) for his conduct during the First Battle of El Alamein. The citation for his award read:

Colonel Gentry was GSO 1 of 2 New Zealand Division in the battle of Alamein. He displayed conspicuous skill and organising ability in the field during the complicated mobile operations leading up to the stabilisation of the Alamein line and the hard fighting which immediately ensued. This officer during a period of great stress and often under heavy fire, displayed the greatest coolness, skill and determination which was an inspiration to all with whom he came in contact.

— New Zealand Gazette, 21 September 1944

In September 1942, he was promoted to brigadier and appointed commander of the 6th Infantry Brigade, the previous commander having been made a prisoner of war. Despite having no experience in commanding infantry, he led the brigade well until August 1943, at which time he replaced Stewart as Deputy Chief of Staff to Lieutenant General Edward Puttick. He served in this role for nearly 18 months before rejoining the 2NZEF.

After a period in Egypt in command of New Zealand troops there, from February 1945 Gentry commanded the newly formed 9th Infantry Brigade. His new command included the Divisional Cavalry and Machine Gun Battalion, both of which had been converted to an infantry role and were joined by the 22nd Battalion. After a period of training, the brigade participated in the final stages of the Italian campaign and Gentry was awarded a Bar to his DSO for his leadership of the brigade during this time. Command of his brigade was passed to Stewart on 10 November 1945 and Gentry returned to New Zealand. He was discharged from the 2NZEF in March 1946.

== Later life ==
After serving for a time with the Joint Chiefs of Staff, the organisation responsible for the British Commonwealth Occupation Force (BCOF) in Japan, Gentry had a second term as Deputy Chief of Staff, this time to Major General Norman Weir. In 1949 he attended the Imperial Defence College (now known as the Royal College of Defence Studies) in England. After completion of his courses, Gentry returned to staff duties in New Zealand, serving as Adjutant General to Stewart, now Chief of Staff, and worked with him in preparing plans for the Government's commitment to deploy military forces to the Middle East in the event of hostilities with the Soviet Union. This work led to several clashes with the Government. In the 1950 Kings's Birthday Honours, he was promoted Commander of the Order of the British Empire (CBE). In 1953, he was awarded the Queen Elizabeth II Coronation Medal.

Promoted to major general, from 1952 to 1955 Gentry served as Chief of the General Staff of the New Zealand Military Forces. He represented New Zealand in ANZUS and was involved in planning for the defence of Southeast Asia. In the 1954 Queen's Birthday Honours, he was made a Companion of the Order of the Bath. The following year he retired from the military. In a break with convention he was not rewarded with a knighthood for his services. This may have been due to some ill-feeling within the Government regarding his work developing proposed plans for New Zealand's Middle East deployment. He was appointed knighted three years later by the newly elected Labour Government in the 1958 Queen's Birthday Honours.

In his retirement Gentry had a strong relationship with the Boy Scouts Association and served as its New Zealand president from 1957 to 1967. He was awarded the association's Silver Wolf. He died on 13 October 1991 in Lower Hutt, where he had lived for many years, at the age of 92. His wife, whom he married in 1926, died in 1994.

== Notes ==
Military offices
Preceded by Keith Stewart	Chief of the General Staff; 1952–1955	Succeeded by Stephen Weir
