= J Force =

New Zealand military in occupied Japan 1946–1948

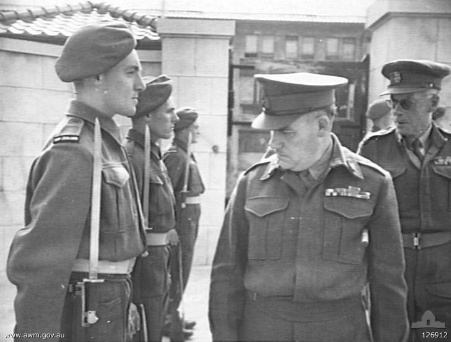
- Lieutenant General John Northcott, commander-in-chief of the BCOF, inspects an honour guard of New Zealand troops in Japan, April 1946
- Active: 1946–48
- Country: New Zealand
- Type: Occupation force
- Size: 4,000
- Part of: BCOF

J Force (sometimes referred to as "Jayforce") was the name given to the New Zealand forces that were allocated to the British Commonwealth Occupation Force (BCOF) which occupied Japan following the end of the Second World War. The force was deployed between 1946 and 1948, after which it was disbanded and its personnel repatriated to New Zealand.

== Background ==
Upon the surrender of Japan which ended the combat phase of the Second World War, Allied Forces, including New Zealanders, Australians, Canadians, and Indians, entered Japan as an occupying force in February 1946 to restore the peace, clean up debris from the atomic blast, help rebuild and direct Japan into becoming a democratic society. Within a week of the surrender Britain invited New Zealand to participate in the occupation of Japan. Due to its weakened condition at the end of the war Britain lacked the resources to provide a force by itself and it wanted members of Commonwealth to help supply sufficient numbers to show the United States that it was still a major power. On 21 August 1945 the New Zealand government agreed to contribute both a land and an air contingent.

== Land forces ==
=== Initial draft ===
The army contribution which consisted of both male and female members was made through a number of drafts. The initial contingent of the NZEF (Japan) was formed in Florence, Italy, on 19 November 1945. This was intended to provide the initial occupation force until a special occupation force could be created in New Zealand.

Prime Minister Peter Fraser wanted the 5,000-strong contribution to be drawn from single male volunteers from the 2NZEF. However, its commander, Lieutenant-General Sir Bernard Freyberg, did not believe this would provide sufficient numbers. As a result, all single non-Maori men from the 13th, 14th and 15th Reinforcements were conscripted for the force. Volunteer officers, and specialists from earlier reinforcements as well as any Maori who wished to volunteer were allowed to make up the required numbers. As a result, a large number of this draft were very unhappy that after having survived the war they were going to Japan instead of home.

The force of just over 4,000 men was built around the 9th Infantry Brigade Group, and was placed under the command of Brigadier K. L. Stewart, who was later replaced by Brigadier W. G. Gentry. The initial draft consisted of two infantry battalions—the 27th and 22nd Battalions—as well as the 2nd Divisional Cavalry Regiment, the 25th Field Battery, and the 5th Engineer Company along with supporting elements which included signals, transport, workshops and medical units. Among the first draft were 36 Women's Army Auxiliary Corps personnel (WAACs) and 30 women from the New Zealand Army Nursing Service (NZANS). All were volunteers. The Royal New Zealand Air Force had no problems filling the initial 24 flying positions and 250 support staff positions from over 1,500 applications.

On 8 March 1946 the squadron complete with its aircraft departed New Zealand on the British aircraft carrier HMS Glory. Both the land and air force contributions arrived off the port of Kure on the Inland Sea of Japan in March 1946 in the company of HMNZS Achilles and HMNZS Hawera, which joined the Force from their stations in the Pacific where they had been serving during the Japanese surrender.

=== Relief drafts ===
In New Zealand service in Japan was more popular with applications from returned servicemen who were having trouble readjusting to civilian life as well as from young men and women who had missed out on wartime service and wanted adventure. Between May 1946 and August 1947 four relief drafts were dispatched from New Zealand to Japan. The relief drafts also featured women in the form of nurses, shorthand typists, hostesses and welfare staff.

== Deployment ==
By the time the first New Zealand forces arrived in March 1946 United States military forces had already occupied most of Japan. The British Commonwealth Occupation Force (BCOF) was to be responsible for Hiroshima Prefecture as it contained a large port, Kure, and an adjacent airfield, Iwakuni. However, the zone of deployment was not big enough and so the area was extended to neighbouring prefectures. Within the BCOF J Force was responsible for the largely rural Yamaguchi Prefecture and Mishima Island, both in the south of Honshu.

The initial draft encountered uncomfortable living conditions and poor food, which they compared unfavourably with what they had experienced in Italy. By the time the second relief draft arrived the quality of the accommodation and the supply of food had improved considerably. Because members of the BCOF were paid in pounds sterling whose exchange rate with the yen was set at an artificially low rate in an effort to slow inflation, this allowed members of the force to make money on the black market supplying Japanese with basic goods such as food and soap. Boredom was also initially a major problem, but as non-fraternisation rules were progressively relaxed high rates of venereal disease developed.

=== Occupation duties ===
J Force's first task was searching for and collecting military equipment. Little was found as Yamaguchi had not had a major military presence during the war. J Force also oversaw the repatriation of Japanese soldiers coming home from the war and Koreans being returned to their country. Post-war Japan was economically devastated which made it an ideal environment for black marketeering. As such, J Force's policing duties included monitoring black market groups and also large gatherings of people on public occasions and generally keeping order until civilian government could be re-established. J Force also assisted the Americans in promoting democracy in Japan by supervising local and national elections in the prefecture. For a period of a month J Force also provided a guard battalion to Tokyo. This was based at Ebisu Barracks and took part in ceremonial guard duty at the Imperial Palace and the British Embassy.

== Air force activities ==
=== Fighter operations ===
The Royal New Zealand Air Force (RNZAF) reformed No. 14 Squadron RNZAF to provide its contribution. To outfit the squadron, the US provided Corsair FG-1D fighter aircraft, and extended its Lend-lease arrangement to cover the cost. The squadron was commanded by Squadron Leader Jesse de Willimoff, who was later succeeded by Squadron Leader D.F St George. Initially located in southern Honshu at the former Japanese naval air base at Iwakuni, the squadron undertook armed air patrols designed to protect armament and bomb dumps, identify locations of hidden ammunition, and check schoolyards for forbidden military parades. They also undertook surveillance flights over the seas between Japan and Korea to identify and turn back boats from smuggling Koreans into Japan.

The squadron stayed in Japan for second year despite lacking a third of its ground staff due to the New Zealand Treasury Department refusing to fund recruiting advertisements. In February 1948, No.14 Squadron moved to Hōfu Air Field, where they replaced Royal Australian Air Force Mustangs. After the decision was made to withdraw J Force, twenty Corsairs were stacked together at one end of the airfield in October 1949 and set alight as the air force considered the aircraft to be at the end of their useful life and could not justify the expense of returning them to New Zealand. The only casualty during the deployment was Flight Lieutenant C. W. N Wright who was killed when his aircraft crashed on takeoff. Personnel departed Japan on 25 November 1948 on MV Westralia.

=== Support services ===
Flying Dakota transport aircraft, the RNZAF's No. 41 (Transport) Squadron provided the link between New Zealand and Japan for J Force. Operating over one of the longest air transport routes in the world, the squadron operated between February 1946 and April 1948. Once a week a Dakota departed on the 20,000 km return flight between Whenuapai and Iwakuni carrying supplies and personnel between the two destinations.

== Return to New Zealand and post-occupation ==
When Great Britain and India withdrew from the BCOF in 1947 enthusiasm for New Zealand’s ongoing involvement waned. In April 1948 the New Zealand government made the decision to withdraw from Japan. The last New Zealand J Force troops returned home in September 1948. In total approximately 12,000 New Zealanders served in Japan during the occupation, while 15 members were killed in accidents or died of illness. They are buried in the Commonwealth cemetery at Yokohama. Some New Zealand personnel would later return to Japan on R&R during the Korean War (1950–1953).

Once back in New Zealand J Force personnel found they were treated differently from World War II veterans. Their service went unrecognised and until 1964 they were not eligible to join the RSA or receive war pensions. It was not until 1995 that the New Zealand Service Medal 1946–1949 was instituted to recognise the service of J Force veterans in Japan.

== Organisation ==
J Force

9th Brigade

- Divisional Cavalry Regiment
- 22nd Battalion (2nd Battalion, New Zealand Regiment from 7 August 1947)
- 27th Battalion (3rd Battalion, New Zealand Regiment from 7 August 1947)

Support Units

- Signals Company
- 5 Engineering Company
- 6 General Hospital
- 4 Base Ordnance Depot
- 11 Mobile Dental Unit
- 11 Provost Company
- 16 Workshops
- 19 ASC Company
- 25 Field Battery
- Welfare Section (WAAC)

RNZAF

- No. 14 Squadron

== Bibliography ==
- Bentley, Geoffrey (1969). RNZAF: A Short History (Hardback ed.). Wellington: A.H. & A. W. Reed. OCLC 74987.
- Brocklebank, Laurie (1997). Jayforce: New Zealand and the Military Occupation of Japan 1945–48. Auckland: Oxford University Press. ISBN 0-19-558362-0.
- Gillespie, Oliver (1952). The Pacific. Wellington: Historical Publications Branch. OCLC 8061134.
- Henderson, Jim (1958). 22 Battalion. The Official History of New Zealand in the Second World War. Wellington: Historical Publications Branch. OCLC 11626508.
- McClure, Margaret (2012). Fighting Spirit: 75 Years of the RNZAF (Hardback). Auckland: Random House. ISBN 978-1-86979-610-5.
- McGibbon, Ian (1996). New Zealand and the Korean War. Combat Operations Volume II. Auckland: Oxford University Press. ISBN 0-19-558343-4.
- McGibbon, Ian (2000). The Oxford Companion to New Zealand Military History. Auckland: Oxford University Press. ISBN 0-19-558376-0.
- Parr, Alison (2012). The Occupiers: New Zealand Veterans Remember Post-war Japan (Paperback ed.). Auckland: Penguin Books. ISBN 978-014-3567240.
