= Norman Weir =

New Zealand military leader (1893–1961)

Sir Norman Weir
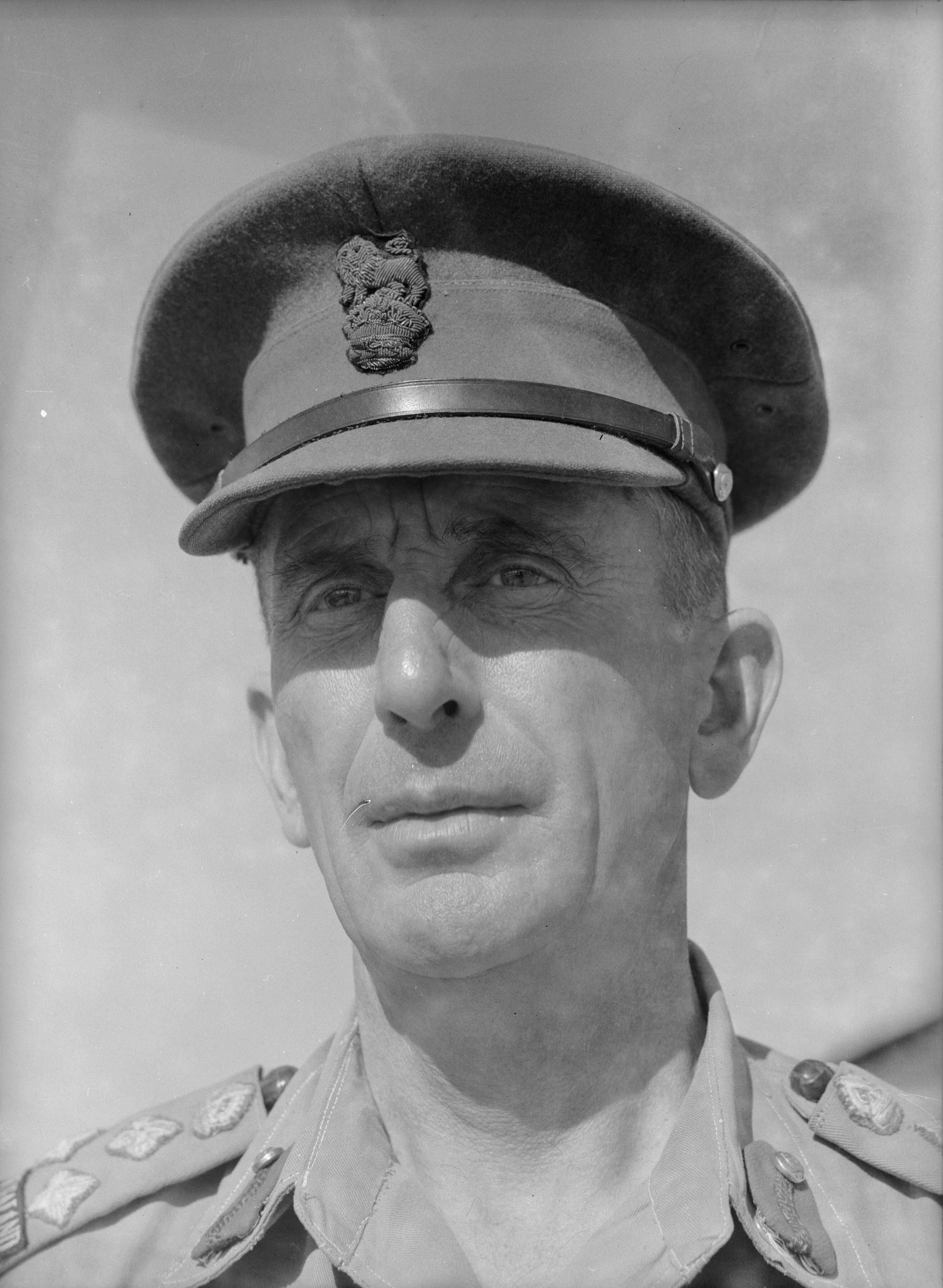
- Portrait of Norman Weir, a brigadier at the time, Egypt 1943
- Born: 6 July 1893; Heathcote Valley, Christchurch, New Zealand
- Died: 11 July 1961 (aged 68); Hamilton, New Zealand
- Military career
- Allegiance: New Zealand
- Branch: New Zealand Military Forces
- Service years: 1911–49
- Rank: Major General
- Commands: Chief of the General Staff (1946–49); 4th Division (1942)
- Conflicts: First World War; Gallipoli campaign; Second World War; Home Front
- Awards: Knight Commander of the Order of the British Empire; Companion of the Order of the Bath; Mentioned in Despatches; Legion of Merit (United States)

Major General Sir Norman William McDonald Weir, KBE, CB (6 July 1893 – 11 July 1961) was a professional soldier in the New Zealand Military Forces. He served during the First and Second World Wars, and was Chief of the General Staff of the New Zealand Military Forces from 1946 to 1949.

== Early life ==
Weir was born in the Heathcote Valley, near Christchurch. His father, a fireman, was an Irish immigrant while his mother was originally from Christchurch. From an early age, Weir had ambitions of a career in the military. After completing his education at Christchurch West District High School, he was of the first ten cadets from New Zealand to enter the Royal Military College at Duntroon, Australia, in 1911.

Following the outbreak of the First World War, Weir volunteered for the New Zealand Expeditionary Force (NZEF) without having completed his course at Duntroon. He embarked with the main body of the NZEF on 16 October 1914. A lieutenant in the Auckland Infantry Battalion, he participated in the Gallipoli campaign and was wounded during the Second Battle of Krithia on 8 May 1915. He was later repatriated to New Zealand.

== Interwar period ==
After recovering from his wounds, Weir joined the New Zealand Staff Corps. He served in a number of staff positions for the next several years. In 1930, he was named commander of a military police contingent that was raised for service in Western Samoa but was ultimately not required. He later served as a staff officer at Central Command and at defence headquarters. In 1937 he was a colonel and was part of the New Zealand contingent sent to London for the coronation of King George VI and Queen Elizabeth. He was later aide-de-camp to New Zealand's governor general.

== Second World War ==
Weir was a lieutenant colonel and in command of the Northern Military District when the Second World War began. He was promoted to colonel and then brigadier in 1940 and commanded the Central Military District. When the 4th Division, one of three intended for home defence, was raised in April 1942 he was made its commander and promoted to temporary major general. He was appointed a Commander of the Order of the British Empire in the 1942 New Year Honours.

In December 1942, Weir was posted to the headquarters of the Second New Zealand Expeditionary Force (2NZEF) in Egypt. He was responsible for the administrative needs of the 2NZEF. In January 1943, while on a visit to the 2nd New Zealand Division which was positioned on the outskirts of Tripoli, Weir, together with Brigadier William Gentry and Major General Bernard Freyberg, were ambushed and came under fire from Italian and German troops. Freyberg escaped and organised a party from a machine gun company to retrieve the brigadiers, but both had managed to evade capture by the time of its arrival. On linking up with the retrieval party, Weir stated he was "... too old for this, I'm too old for this."

From November 1943, Weir served as commander of New Zealand forces in Egypt. In 1945 he returned to New Zealand as Quartermaster General of the military. For his service with the 2NZEF he was mentioned in despatches.

== Later life ==
In January 1946 Weir succeeded Lieutenant General Edward Puttick as Chief of the General Staff, New Zealand Military Forces. His temporary rank of major general was made substantive, and he was awarded the United States Legion of Merit. In his new role, he had to oversee the demobilisation of 2NZEF and contend with a military transitioning from a wartime footing to peacetime soldiering. As the threat of the Cold War increased, he favoured the reintroduction of compulsory military training and the reconstitution of the Territorial Force as part of an overall commitment to send forces to the Middle East in the event of war with Russia. He retired from the military in September 1949, having been appointed a Knight Commander of the Order of the British Empire in the 1948 King's Birthday Honours.

Weir spent his later years in Cambridge. He died in Hamilton on 11 July 1961, survived by his wife and daughter. After a funeral service in Cambridge, he was buried at the nearby Hautapu Cemetery.

== Notes ==
Military offices
Preceded by Lieutenant General Edward Puttick	Chief of the General Staff; January 1946 – March 1949	Succeeded by Major General Keith Lindsay Stewart
