= 1942 New Year Honours (New Zealand) =

Annual awards for New Zealanders

The 1942 New Year Honours in New Zealand were appointments by King George VI to various orders and honours in recognition of war service by New Zealanders. The awards celebrated the passing of 1941 and the beginning of 1942, and were announced on 1 January 1942. No civilian awards were made.

The recipients of honours are displayed here as they were styled before their new honour.

== Order of the British Empire ==
=== Knight Commander (KBE) ===
Military division, additional

- Major-General Bernard Cyril Freyberg VC CB CMG DSO LLD – New Zealand Military Forces.
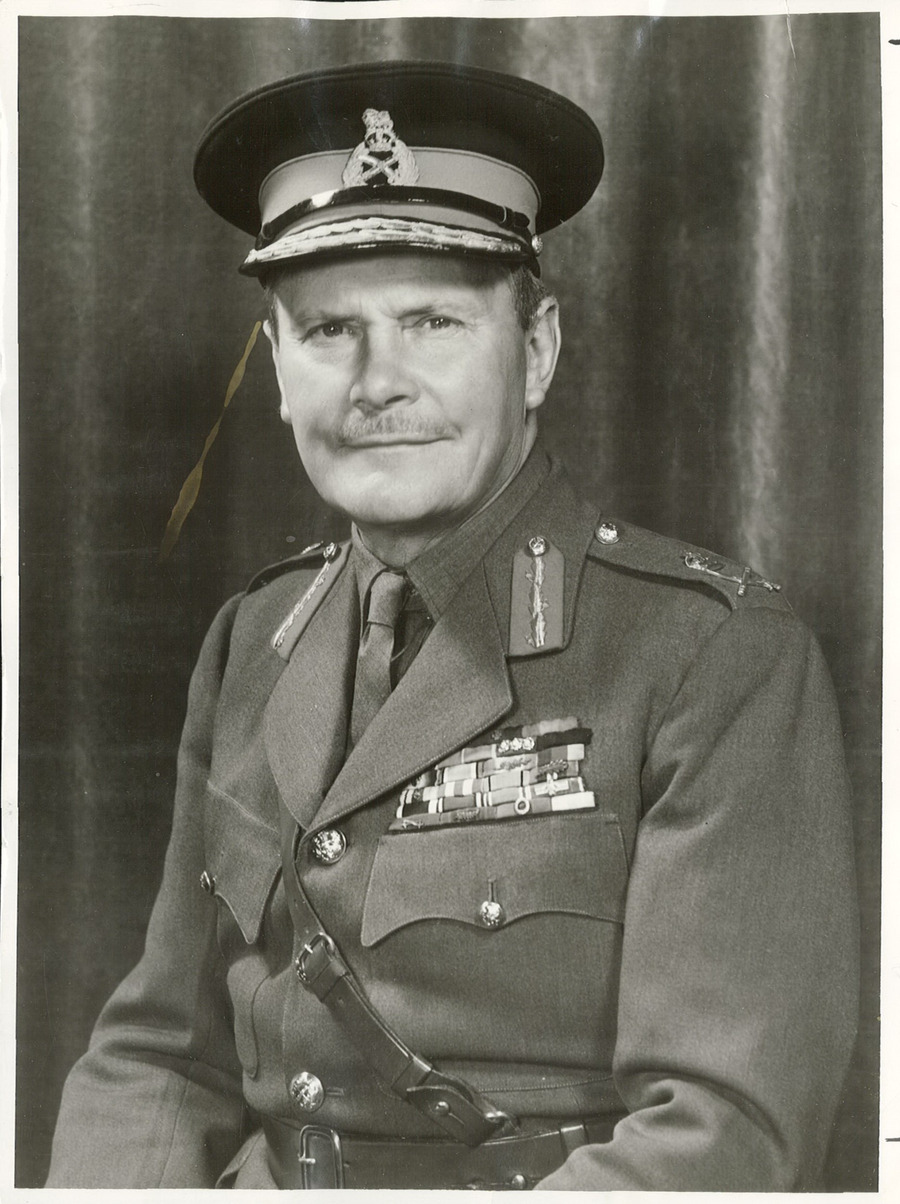
Sir Bernard Freyberg

=== Commander (CBE) ===
Military division, additional

- Colonel (temporary Brigadier) Norman William McDonald Weir – New Zealand Staff Corps; of Wellington.
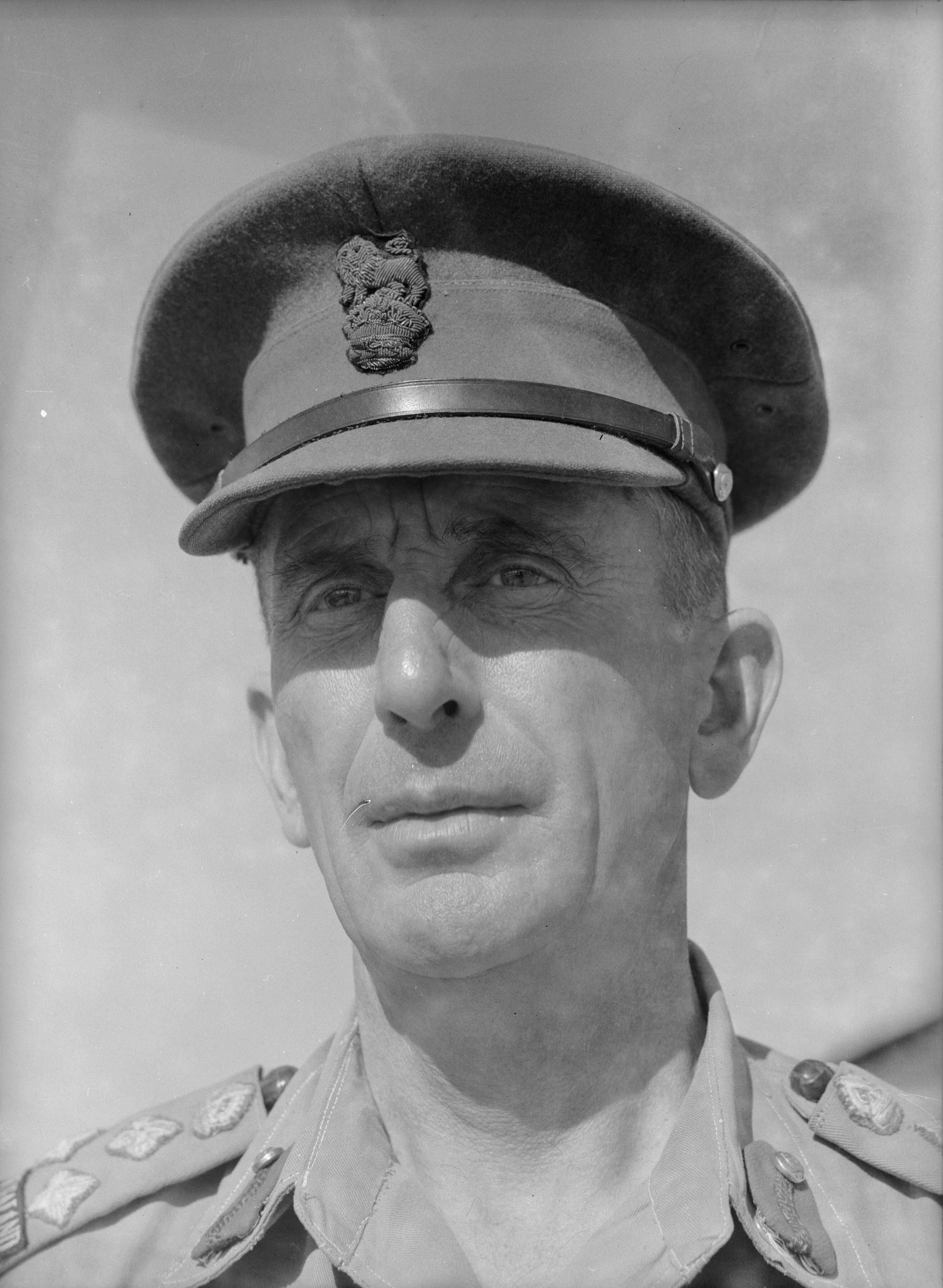
Norman Weir

=== Officer (OBE) ===
Military division, additional

- Wing Commander John Thomas Brown – Royal Air Force; of Christchurch.
- Surgeon Commander Harold Keith Corkhill VD MB ChB FRCS – Royal New Zealand Naval Volunteer Reserve; of Auckland.

=== Member (MBE) ===
Military division, additional

- Lieutenant and Quartermaster Alfred Brant – New Zealand Permanent Staff, New Zealand Military Forces; of Auckland.
- Charles Henry James Stone – warrant engineer, Royal Navy.
- Acting Squadron Leader Odling Ross Toyne – Royal Air Force.
- Warrant Officer George Wilfred Trott – Royal New Zealand Air Force; of Auckland.

== British Empire Medal (BEM) ==
Military division, for meritorious service

- Engine Room Artificer (1st Class) Charles Thomas Bond – Royal Navy; of Auckland.

== Bar to Air Force Cross (AFC) ==
- Acting Wing Commander Arthur Edmund Clouston AFC – Royal Air Force.
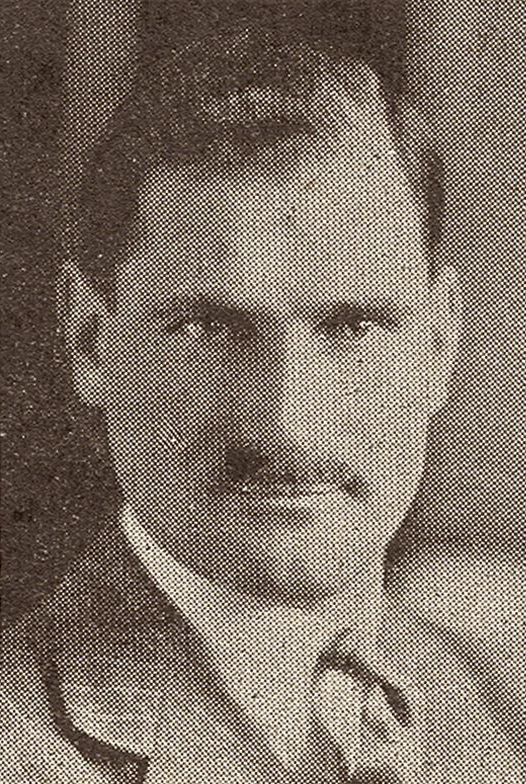
Arthur Clouston

== Air Force Cross (AFC) ==
- Acting Squadron Leader John Adams DFC – Royal New Zealand Air Force.
- Wing Commander George Ernest Watt – Royal Air Force.

== Air Force Medal (AFM) ==
- Sergeant Maurice Kidson – air observer, Royal New Zealand Air Force.
- Sergeant Daniel Paul Phillips – Royal New Zealand Air Force.
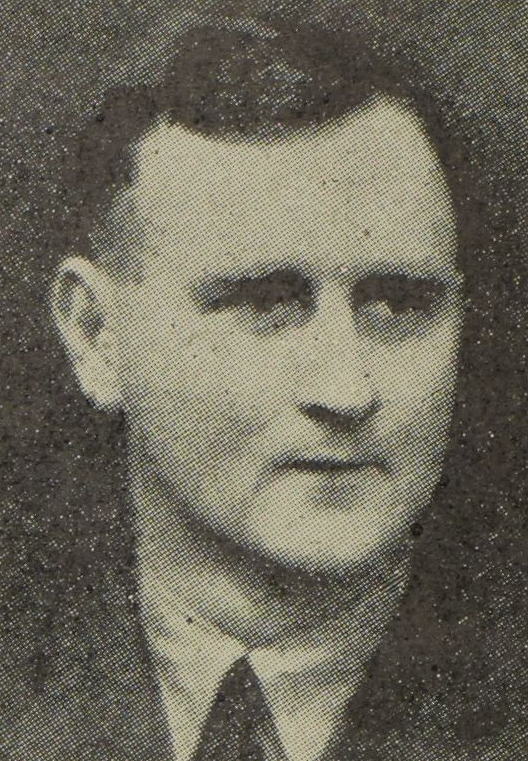
Daniel Paul Phillips

== Distinguished Service Cross (DSC) ==
- Lieutenant Charles George Palmer – Royal New Zealand Naval Volunteer Reserve.
- Lieutenant-Commander Frederick George Tidswell – Royal New Zealand Naval Volunteer Reserve.

== Mention in despatches ==
- Acting Flight Lieutenant Thomas James Desmond Baber – Royal New Zealand Air Force.
- Sergeant Kenneth Keremehana Bevan – Royal New Zealand Air Force.
- Flight Lieutenant Matthew Richard Cable – Royal Air Force Volunteer Reserve.
- Sergeant Valton William James Crook – Royal New Zealand Air Force.
- Acting Flight Lieutenant Alexander James Muir Fabian – Royal Air Force Volunteer Reserve.
- Sergeant Martin Edmund Coston Fell – Royal New Zealand Air Force.
- Flying Officer Douglas Veale Gilmour – Royal Air Force.
- Acting Wing Commander Patrick Geraint Jameson DFC* – Reserve of Air Force Officers.
- Wing Commander Geoffrey Twyford Jarman DSO DFC – Royal Air Force.
- Acting Group Captain Lancelot Elworthy Jarman DFC – Royal Air Force.
- Sergeant Gordon Fraser Jones – Royal New Zealand Air Force.
- Acting Group Captain Hector Douglas McGregor DSO – Royal Air Force.
- Flying Officer George Ewart Milnes – Royal Air Force.
- Acting Flight Lieutenant John Edward Stewart Morton – Royal Air Force.
- Acting Squadron Leader Keith Day Pearce Murray MC – Royal Air Force Volunteer Reserve.
- Acting Flight Lieutenant Raymond John Newton – Royal New Zealand Air Force.
- Acting Squadron Leader John Ramsay St John – Reserve of Air Force Officers.
- FLight Lieutenant Joseph Cunningham Simpson – Royal Air Force.
- Flight Lieutenant William Stanley Simpson MBE – Royal New Zealand Air Force.
- Flying Officer James Victor Verran DFC – Royal Air Force.
- Flight Lieutenant Wilfred Maurice Chalk Williams DFC – Royal New Zealand Air Force.
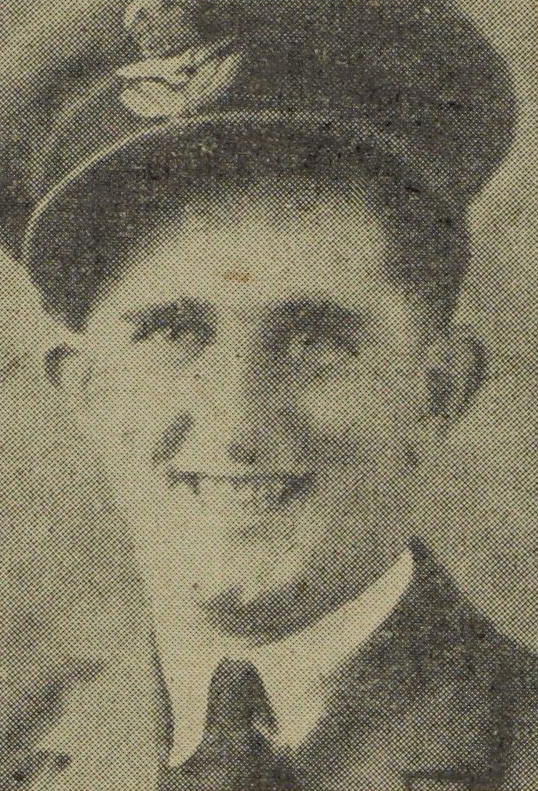
Thomas Baber

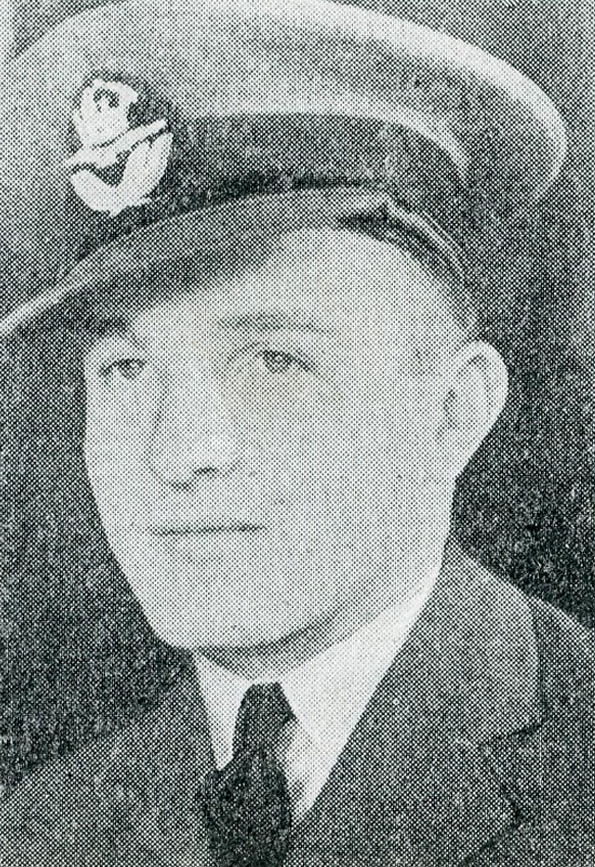
Douglas Gilmour

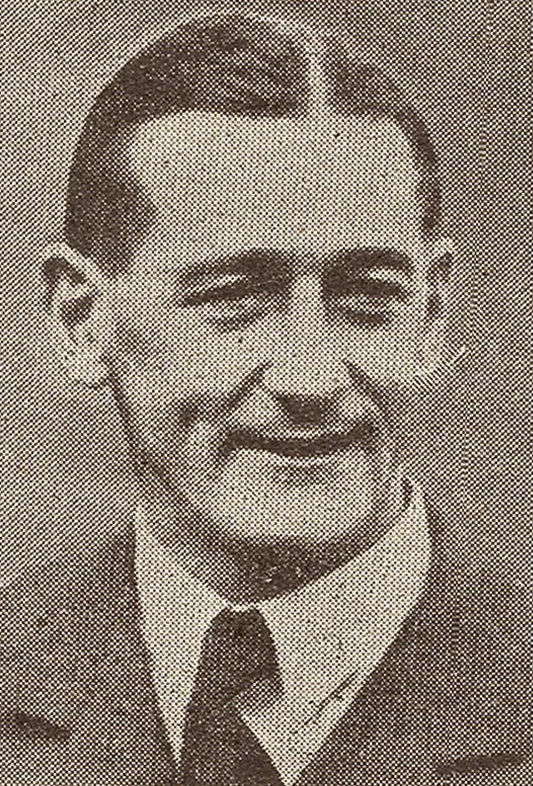
Patrick Jameson

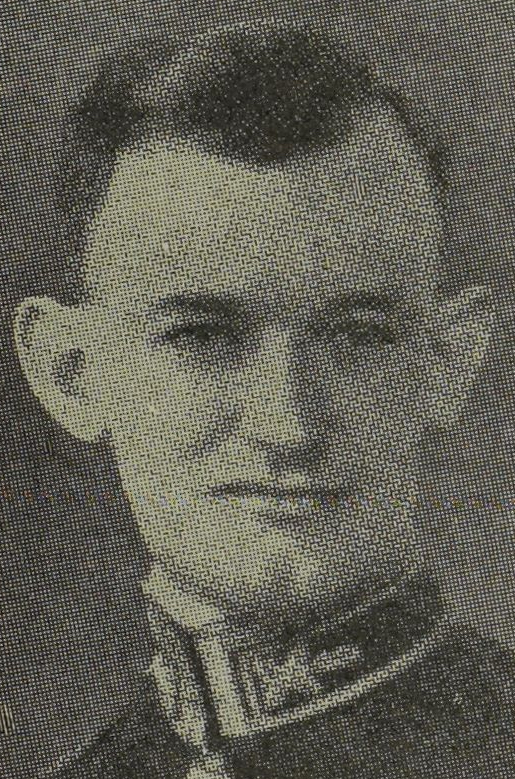
Hector McGregor

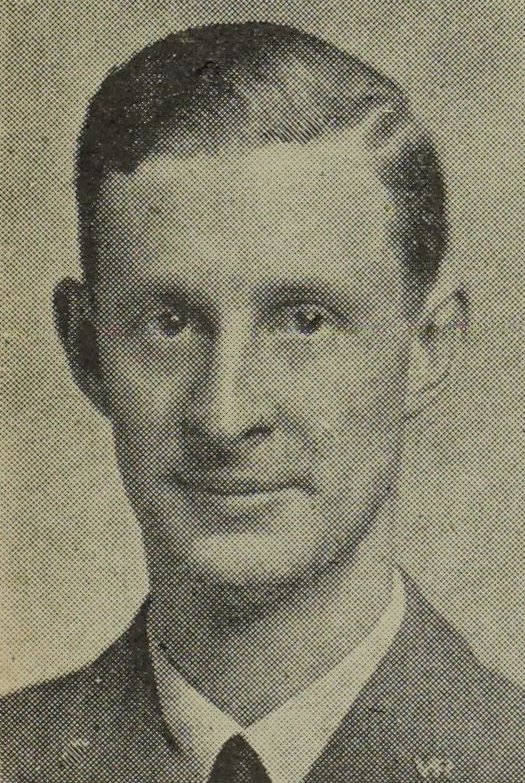
George Milnes

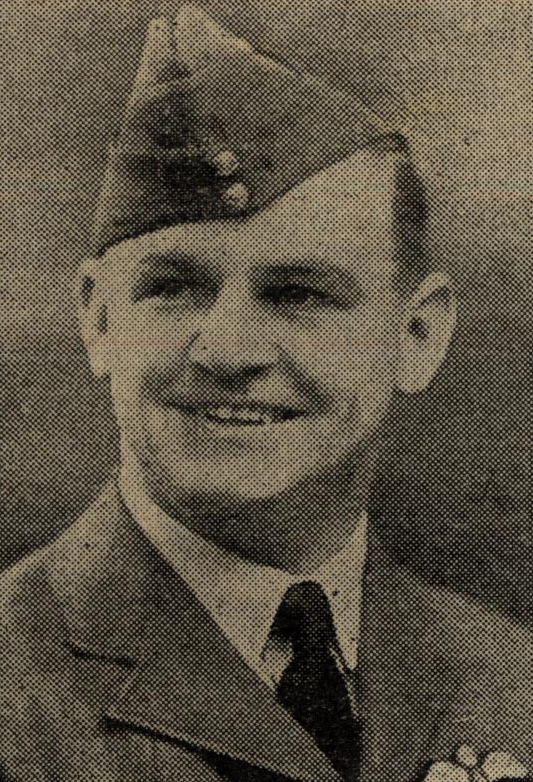
Ray Newton

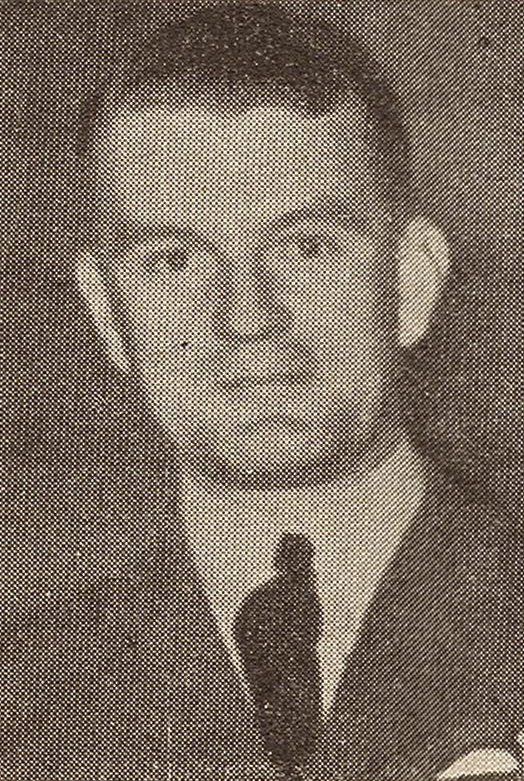
Wilfred Williams
