= Battle of Crete order of battle =

Order of battle for World War II battle

This is the complete order of battle for the Battle of Crete and related operations in 1941.

== Allied ==
=== Land forces ===
==== Commonwealth & Allied forces, Crete - "Creforce" ====
Headquarters Creforce - (Eastern Zone, east of Chania)
Major-general Bernard Freyberg, VC, Colonel Stewart

- C Squadron, 3rd The King's Own Hussars (seven light tanks)

Major G.W.Peck
10 Light Tank Mk VIs

- B Squadron, 7th Royal Tank Regiment

Lieutenant George Simpson
Two Matilda tanks, crewed in part by two officers and five gunners of the 2/3rd Field Regiment, Royal Australian Artillery (RAA).

- 1st Battalion, the Welch Regiment

Lieutenant Colonel A. Duncan, MC (force reserve)

==== 2nd New Zealand Division ====
Headquarters New Zealand Division - Brigadier, Acting Major General Edward Puttick - (Western Zone, west of Chania)

- 27th New Zealand Machine Gun Battalion (Lt. Col. FJ Gwilliam) (179 personnel)
- 5th New Zealand Field Artillery Regiment (less infantry detachment) (256 personnel)
- 4th New Zealand Infantry Brigade (Brig. Lindsay Inglis) between Chania and Galatas
  - 18th New Zealand Infantry Battalion (677 personnel)
  - 19th New Zealand Infantry Battalion (565 personnel)
  - 20th New Zealand Infantry Battalion (637 personnel)
  - 1st Light Troop, RA (87 personnel)
- 5th New Zealand Infantry Brigade (Brig. James Hargest) (Maleme and Platanias)
  - 21st New Zealand Infantry Battalion (376 personnel)
  - 22nd New Zealand Infantry Battalion (644 personnel)
  - 23rd New Zealand Infantry Battalion (571 personnel)
  - 28th (Maori) Infantry Battalion (619 personnel)
  - 7th Field Company New Zealand Engineers (148 personnel)
  - 19th Army Field Corps Company (216 personnel)
  - New Zealand Field Punishment Centre (FPC) Prisoners were released to fight the enemy.
  - 1st Greek Regiment (1,030 personnel), (Col. IP Papadimitropoulos)
  - Evelpidon Officers' Academy (17 officers, 300 cadets), (Lt. Col. Loukas Kitsos)
- 10th New Zealand Infantry Brigade (Lt. Col. Howard Kippenberger) (Galatas)
  - New Zealand Divisional Cavalry (194 personnel)
  - New Zealand Composite Battalion (1,007 personnel)
  - 6th Greek Regiment (Lt. Col. M Grigoriou)(1,485 personnel)
  - 8th Greek Regiment (Lt. Col. Pan Karkoulas)(1,013 personnel)

==== British 14th Infantry Brigade ====
- Headquarters, 14 Bde (Brig. Brian Herbert Chappel) – at Heraklion
  - 2nd Battalion, Leicestershire Regiment (Lt. Col. CHV Cox, DSO, MC) (637 personnel)
  - 2nd Battalion, York and Lancaster Regiment (Lt. Col. A Gilroy) (742 personnel)
  - 2nd Battalion, Black Watch (Major AA Pitcairn, temporary commander (Note: Killed in action - 20/21 November 1941 at Tobruk.) (Note: Pitcairn was replacing Lt. Col. AK Hamilton, who was ill.)) (867 personnel)
  - 1st Battalion, Argyll and Sutherland Highlanders (Lt. Col. RCB Anderson, DSO, MC) (655 personnel) – Tymbaki sector
  - 7th Medium Regiment, RA (Maj. R.J.B. Snook, DSO (wounded - 20 May 1941). No artillery weapons; equipped and served at Crete as infantry. (450 personnel)

Attached to 14 Bde:

  - Australian 2/4th Battalion (Lt. Col. Ivan Dougherty) (Note: All Australian units are prefixed "2/" to denote that they are part of the 2nd AIF, not militia.) (550 personnel)
  - Greek 3rd Regiment (Lt. Col. Betinakis) (656 personnel)
  - Greek 7th Regiment (Col. E Cheretis) (877 personnel)
  - Greek Garrison Battalion (commander unknown; ex-Greek 5th "Crete" Division, left behind as a garrison when their division was summoned to defend the mainland) 830 personnel)

==== 19th Australian Infantry Brigade ====
Unit	Commander	Remarks
HQ 19 Brigade	Brig. George Vasey	At Georgioupolis
2/1st Australian Infantry Battalion	Lt. Col. Ian R. Campbell	620 personnel; Rethymno; Campbell commanded all Allied forces in the Rethymno area
2/11th Australian Infantry Battalion	Lt. Col. Ray Sandover	650 personnel; Rethymno
2/7th Australian Infantry Battalion	Lt. Col. Theo Walker (par. 21)	About 550 personnel. Based at Heraklion; redeployed to Maleme and saw action in the Souda-Chania area ("42nd Street") during the battle.
2/8th Australian Infantry Battalion	Lt. Col. John W. Mitchell	About 400 personnel. Based at Chania; reinforced British forces around Perivolia and Mournies, and saw action in the Souda-Chania area ("42nd Street") during the battle.
No. 5 Battery, 2/3rd Field Regiment		
No. 6 Battery, 2/3rd Field Regiment	Maj. I. J. Bessell-Browne	90 personnel, equipped with captured Italian weapons: four 100 mm guns and four 75 mm guns.
4th Greek Regiment	Col. M. Trifon	1,300 personnel; Rethymno
5th Greek Regiment	Lt. Col. I Servos	1,200 personnel; Rethymno
Gendarmerie Privates School	Col. Iak Chaniotis	916 personnel; Rethymno

==== Mobile Base Defence Organization ====
Headquarters Mobile Base Defence Organization - Maj.-Gen. CE Weston-Souda Bay

- 15th Coast Regiment, RA
- "S" Royal Marine Composite Battalion, Maj. R Garrett (Royal Marines)
- 1st Battalion, the Rangers, the King's Royal Rifle Corps - (later designated 9th Battalion, the King's Royal Rifle Corps (the Rangers))
- 102nd (Northumberland Hussars) Anti-Tank Regiment, Royal Artillery - no equipment, used as infantry
- 106th (Lancashire Hussars) Light Anti-Aircraft Regiment, Royal Artillery - Lt. Col. AF Hely
- 16th Australian Brigade Composite Battalion - 350 officers and men
  Formed from the under strength 2/2nd and 2/3rd Australian infantry battalions
- 17th Australian Brigade Composite Battalion - 270 officers and men
  Formed from the understrength 2/5th and 2/6th Australian infantry battalions
- 2nd Greek Regiment - 930 officers and men
- 2nd Heavy Anti-Aircraft Regiment, Royal Marines

=== Naval forces ===
- Commander-in-Chief, Mediterranean Fleet - Admiral Sir Andrew B Cunningham

==== Forces A1 ====
Force A1 - Rear Admiral H B Rawlings (R.A., 7th Cruiser Squadron)

- Queen Elizabeth-class battleships
  - HMS Warspite (03) - Captain DB Fisher - damaged
  - HMS Valiant (02) - Captain CE Morgan - damaged
- G and H-class destroyers
  - HMS Greyhound (H05) - Cmdr. WR Marshall-A'Deane, sunk 22 May 1941
  - HMS Griffin (H31) - Lt. KRC Letts
  - HMS Havock (H43) - Lt. GRG Watkins
  - HMS Hero (H99) - Cmdr. HW Briggs
- J-class destroyer
  - HMS Jaguar (F34) - Lt. Cmdr. JFW Hine

==== Force B ====
Force B - Capt. Henry A Rowley

- Light cruisers
  - HMS Gloucester (62) - Capt. Henry A Rowley, sunk 22 May 1941 with the loss of 722 crew
  - HMS Fiji (58) - Capt. PBRW William-Powlett, sunk 22 May 1941
  - HMS Orion (85) - Capt. GRB Back - damaged
  - HMS Dido (37) - Capt. HWV McCall - damaged
- Destroyers
  - HMS Decoy (H75) - Cmdr. EG McGregor
  - HMS Hereward (H93) - Lt. WJ Munn, sunk by enemy aircraft 29 May 1941
  - HMS Hotspur (H01) - Lt.Cmdr. CPF Brown
  - HMS Imperial (D09) - Lt. Cmdr. CA De W Kitcat, sunk 29 May 1941 off Crete
  - HMS Jackal (F22) - Lt. Cmdr. MP Jonas
  - HMS Kimberley (F50) - Lt. Cmdr. JSM Richardson

==== Force C ====
Force C - Rear Admiral Edward Leigh Stuart King (C.O. 15th Cruiser Squadron)
Ship	Commander	Armament	Tonnage	Remarks
HMS Naiad (93)	Capt. MHA Kelsey			Light cruiser - damaged
HMAS Perth (D29)	Capt. Sir PW Bowyer-Smyth	8x6 inch guns, 8x4 inch guns, 4x3-pdr guns, 8x21 inch torpedo tubes	6,830 tons	Light cruiser - damaged
HMS Kandahar (F28)	Cmdr. WGA Robson			Destroyer
HMS Nubian (F36)	Cmdr. RW Ravenhill	8×4.7 inch guns, 4x2-pdr guns, 8x0.5 inch machineguns, 4x21 inch torpedo tubes		Destroyer - damaged
HMS Kingston (F64)	Lt. Cmdr. P Sommerville			Destroyer - damaged
HMS Juno (F46)	Cmdr. St John Tyrwhitt			Destroyer; Sunk 21 May 1941
HMS Calcutta (D82)	Capt. DM Lees			Anti-aircraft cruiser Sunk 1 June 1941 within one hundred miles of Alexandria

==== Force D ====
Force D - Rear-Admiral Irvine Glennie Destruction of Lupo Convoy (21–22 May 1941)
Ship	Commander	Remarks
HMS Dido (37)	Capt. HW McCall	Light cruiser- damaged
HMS Orion (85)	Capt. PBRW William-Powlett	Light cruiser - damaged
HMS Ajax (22)	Capt. EDB McCarthy	Light cruiser - damaged
HMS Janus (F53)	Cmdr. JAW Tothill	Destroyer
HMS Hasty (H24)	Lt.Cmdr. LRK Tyrwhitt	Destroyer
HMS Hereward (H93)	Lt. WJ Munn	Destroyer - sunk by enemy aircraft 29 May 1941
HMS Kimberley	Lt. Cmdr. JSM Richardson	Destroyer

==== Force E ====
Force E - Captain JP Mack (CO 14th Destroyer Flotilla)

- HMS Ilex (D61) - Capt. (D2) H St L Nicholson
- HMS Jervis (F00) - Capt. (D14) P J Mack
- HMAS Nizam (G38) - Lt. Cmdr. Max Joshua Clark
- HMS Carlisle (D67) - Capt. TC Hampton - damaged

==== 5th Destroyer Flotilla ====
5th Destroyer Flotilla - Captain Mountbatten

- HMS Kelly (F01) - Capt. Lord Louis Mountbatten, sunk 23 May 1941
- HMS Kashmir (F12) - Cmdr. HA King, sunk 23 May 1941
- HMS Kelvin (F37) - Cmdr. JH Alison - damaged
- HMS Jackal (F22) - Lt.Cmdr. MP Jonas
- HMS Kipling (F91) - Cmdr. A St Clair-Ford

==== Evacuation Fleet ====
- HMS Ajax

Sphakia evacuation force - Rear-Admiral King

- HMS Phoebe - Capt. Guy Grantham, light cruiser
- HMAS Perth - Capt. Sir P.W. Bowyer-Smith, light cruiser - damaged
- HMS Coventry - Capt. WP Carne, light cruiser
- HMS Calcutta - Capt. DM Lees, anti-aircraft cruiser, sunk 1 June 1941 with 255 survivors
- HMS Glengyle - Capt. CH Petrie, landing ship, infantry (large)
- HMAS Napier (G97) - Capt. Stephen Harry Tolson Arliss RN, N-class flotilla Leader.
- HMAS Nizam (G38) - Lt. Cmdr. Max Joshua Clark
- HMS Kelvin (F37) - Cmdr. JH Alison
- HMS Kandahar (F28) - Cmdr. WGA Robson

=== Air forces ===
- Air Officer Commander-in-Chief, Middle East - Air Chief Marshal Sir Arthur Longmore
- Senior RAF Officer, Crete - Group Captain George Beamish
  - No. 30 Squadron RAF (Squadron Leader RA Milward/Sqn. Ldr. Shannon) - Bristol Blenheim
  - No. 33 Squadron RAF (Squadron Leader Edward Howell, OBE, DFC) - Gloster Gladiator, Hawker Hurricane
  - No. 80 Squadron RAF (Sqn. Ldr. EG Jones) - Gloster Gladiator, Hawker Hurricane
  - No. 112 Squadron RAF (Sqn. Ldr. LG Schwab) - Gloster Gladiator, Hawker Hurricane (Note: Author Roald Dahl was flying with this squadron at the time.)
  - No. 203 Squadron RAF - Bristol Blenheim

== Axis forces ==
=== Land, airborne and air forces ===
==== Fliegerkorps XI ====
Headquarters Fliegerkorps XI - Generalmajor Kurt Student, with Brig. Schlemm (chief of staff), Col. Trettner (Ops) and Maj. Reinhardt (Int)
Unit	Commander	Equipment/remarks
KGzbV 1	Oberst Fritz Morzik	Junkers Ju 52
KGzbV 2	Oberst Rüdiger von Heyking	Ju 52
KGzbV 3	Oberst U. Bucholz	Ju 52
22nd Luftlande Division	General Hans Graf von Sponeck	Force reserve (in Romania)

==== Fliegerkorps VIII ====
Headquarters VIII. Fliegerkorps - General der Flieger Freiherr Wolfram von Richthofen
Unit	Commander	Equipment/remarks
Kampfgeschwader 2	General-Major Herbert Rieckhoff	Do 17Z
Jadgeschwader 77	Major Bernhard Woldenga	Bf 109E
Lehrgeschwader 1	[Oberst F-K Knust	Ju 88A & He 111H
Sturzkampfgeschwader 1	Oberst-Leutnant W. Hagen	Ju 87R
Sturzkampfgeschwader 2	Oberst-Lt O. Dinort	Ju 87R
Sturzkampfgeschwader 77	Major Clemens von Schönborn-Wiesentheid	Ju 87R
Zerstörergeschwader 26	Oberst Johann Schalk	Bf 110C & Bf 110D

==== Luftflotte IV ====
Headquarters Luftflotte IV - General der Flieger Alexander Löhr
Unit	Commander	Remarks
5th Panzer Division	Gustav Fehn	
6th Gebirgs Division	Ferdinand Schörner	

==== Luftlande Sturmregiment ====
Headquarters Luftlande Sturmregiment - Generalmajor Eugen Meindl, then Col. Ramcke, Maj. Braun
Unit	Commander	Remarks
1st Battalion	Major Walter Koch	Glider battalion
2nd Battalion	Major Edgar Stentzler	
3rd Battalion	Major Otto Scherber	
4th Battalion	Hauptmann (Captain) Walter Gericke	

Two glider companies were detached and seconded to 7th Flieger Division, below

==== 7th Flieger Division ====
Headquarters, 7th Flieger Division - Generalleutnant Wilhelm Süssmann
Unit	Commander	Subunits	Remarks
7th Engineer Battalion	Major Liebach		
7th Artillery Battalion	Major Bode		
7th Machine Gun Battalion	Hauptmann Schulz		
7th Anti-tank Battalion	Hauptmann Schmitz		
1st Fallschirmjäger Regiment	Oberst Bruno Bräuer, Capt. Rau, Capt. Count von der Schulenburg	1st Battalion (Major Erich Walther), 2nd Battalion (Hauptmann Burckhardt), 3rd Battalion (Major Karl-Lothar Schulz)	Heraklion
2nd Fallschirmjäger Regiment	Oberst Alfred Sturm, Maj. Schulz, Capt. Paul	1st Battalion (Major Kroh), 2nd Battalion (Hauptmann Erich Pietzonka), 3rd Battalion (Hauptmann Wiedemann)	Rethymno
3rd Fallschirmjäger Regiment	Oberst Richard Heidrich, Lt. Heckel	1st Battalion (Hauptmann Friedrich von der Heydte), 2nd Battalion (Major Derpa), 3rd Battalion (Major Ludwig Heilmann)	Chania

The 2nd Battalion of the 2nd FJ Rgt was used with the 1st FJ Rgt in Heraklion

==== 5th Gebirgs Division ====
Headquarters, 5th Gebirgs Division - Generalmajor Julius Ringel, Maj. Haidlen, Capt. Ferchl
Unit	Commander	Sub units
95th Artillery Battalion	Oberstleutnant Wittmann	
95th Anti-tank Battalion	Major Bindermann	
95th Reconnaissance Battalion	Major Count Castell zu Castell	
95th Engineer Battalion	Major Schaette	
95th Signal Battalion	Major Nolte	
85th Gebirgsjäger Regiment	Oberst August Krakau	1st Battalion - 2nd Battalion - 3rd Battalion
100th Gebirgsjäger Regiment	Oberst Willibald Utz	1st Battalion - 2nd Battalion - 3rd Battalion
141st Gebirgsjäger Regiment (Note: The 141st Gebirgsjäger Regiment was a reinforcement from the 6th Gebirgs Division.)	Oberst Maximilian Jais	1st Battalion - 2nd Battalion - 3rd Battalion

== See also ==
- Battle of Crete
- List of orders of battle

== Sources ==
- Antill, Peter D. (2005). Crete 1941. Osprey Publishing. ISBN 1-84176-844-8.
- Davin, D. M. (1953). Crete. Wellington: Historical Publications Branch.
- Beevor, Antony (1991). Crete: The Battle and the Resistance (pbk. ed.). Great Britain: John Murray. ISBN 0-7195-6831-5.
- Buckley, Christopher (1984) [1952]. Greece and Crete 1941 (Greek pbk edition (in English) ed.). London: P. Efstathiadis & Sons S.A. ISBN 960-226-041-6.
- "Naval action against the German Flotillas". Battle of Crete. Archived from the original on 18 August 2005.
