= 4th Division (New Zealand) =

- Active: 1 November 1941 – 1 April 1944
- Disbanded: 1 April 1944
- Country: New Zealand
- Branch: New Zealand Military Forces
- Role: Home defence
- Part of: Central Military District
- Engagements: World War II

Commanders
- Notable commanders: Norman Weir (1942); Geoffrey Peren (1942–1943)

The 4th Division was one of three home defence divisions of the New Zealand Military Forces formed during World War II. The unit was established on 1 November 1941 and was responsible for protecting the southern part of New Zealand's North Island from invasion. The division was greatly reduced in size during 1943 and was disbanded on 1 April 1944 without seeing combat.

== History ==
As part of the preparations for the possible outbreak of war in the Pacific, the defensive forces stationed in New Zealand were expanded in late 1941. On 1 November, three new brigade headquarters were raised (taking the total in the New Zealand Military Forces, as the New Zealand Army was then known, to seven), and three divisional headquarters were established to coordinate the units located in the Northern, Central and Southern Military Districts. Upon formation, the division in the Central Military District comprised two brigade groups.

The New Zealand Military Forces were further expanded following the outbreak of the Pacific War. The Territorial Force (which comprised reservist personnel) was fully mobilised on 10 January 1942, and reinforced by 7000 men who had originally enlisted in the New Zealand Expeditionary Force for overseas service. The role of the Territorial Force was to counter any Japanese landings in New Zealand, and it was organised into both mobile and fortress units. The Home Guard would support the Territorial units in the event of an invasion.

In 1942, the three divisions stationed in New Zealand were transformed into mobile formations and renamed, and the Central Division became the 4th Division; the divisions in the Northern and Southern Military Districts were redesignated the 1st and 5th Divisions respectively. The 4th Division's inaugural commander was Major General Norman Weir. As of mid 1942, the main elements of the division were the 2nd Infantry Brigade, which was based near Palmerston North, and the 7th Brigade Group, which was located near Masterton. The division also comprised a number of supporting reconnaissance, artillery, engineer and supply units which reported directly to the divisional headquarters. All Army units stationed in New Zealand were held at a high level of readiness to respond to a Japanese landing throughout 1942, though beach defences ceased to be manned from August. In addition, Masterton was struck by an earthquake on 24 June; following this disaster the 1st Battalion, Ruahine Regiment (which formed part of the 7th Brigade Group) patrolled the town and had to recover its colours from a ruined church. Brigadier Geoffrey Peren assumed command of the 4th Division at some point in 1942 and held this position until 1943. Peren had commanded the 2nd Infantry Brigade during 1941 and 1942, and was both a long-serving territorial soldier and the professor of agriculture at Massey University. Weir subsequently served overseas as the commanding officer of New Zealand Troops in Egypt.

The forces stationed in New Zealand were considerably reduced as the threat of invasion passed. During early 1943, each of the three home defence divisions was cut from 22,358 to 11,530 men. The non-divisional units suffered even greater reductions. The New Zealand Government ordered a general stand-down of the defensive forces in the country on 28 June, which led to further reductions in the strength of units and a lower state of readiness. By the end of the year, almost all of the Territorial Force personnel had been demobilised (though they retained their uniforms and equipment), and only 44 soldiers were posted to the three divisional and seven brigade headquarters. The war situation continued to improve and the 4th Division, along with the other two divisions and almost all the remaining Territorial Force units, was disbanded on 1 April 1944.

== Structure ==
In June 1942 the 4th Division comprised

- 2nd Infantry Brigade
  - 1st Battalion, Wellington West Coast Regiment
  - 1st Battalion, Hawke's Bay Regiment
  - 1st Battalion, Taranaki Regiment
- 7th Brigade Group
  - 9th Light Armoured Fighting Vehicle Regiment (Wellington East Coast Mounted Rifles)
  - 2nd Battalion, Wellington Regiment
  - 1st Battalion, Ruahine Regiment
  - 1st Battalion, New Zealand Scottish Regiment
  - 12th Field Regiment, New Zealand Artillery
- Divisional Troops
  - 2nd Light Armoured Fighting Vehicle Regiment (Queen Alexandra's Mounted Rifles)
  - 6th Light Armoured Fighting Vehicle Regiment (Manawatu Mounted Rifles)
- Divisional Artillery
  - 2nd Field Regiment, New Zealand Artillery
  - 20th Field Regiment, New Zealand Artillery

== Bibliography ==
- Cooke, Peter; Crawford, John (2011). The Territorials: The History of the Territorial and Volunteer Forces of New Zealand. Auckland: Random House. ISBN 978-1-8697-9446-0.
- Cooke, Peter D. F. (2016). Defending New Zealand: Ramparts on the Seas 1840-1950s. Wellington: Defence of New Zealand Study Group. ISBN 0-473-06833-8.
