= John Evelyn Duigan =

New Zealand Military general

Sir John Evelyn Duigan
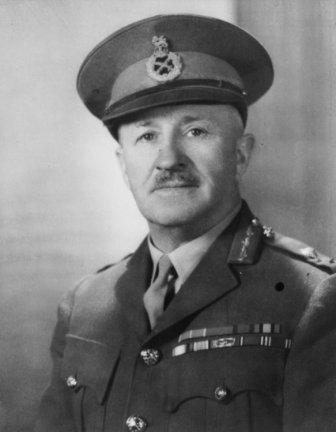
- Sir John Duigan, in the uniform of a major general
- Born: 30 March 1883; Wanganui, New Zealand
- Died: 9 January 1950 (aged 66); Havelock North, New Zealand
- Military career
- Allegiance: New Zealand
- Branch: New Zealand Military Forces
- Service years: 1901–41
- Rank: Major general
- Commands: Chief of the General Staff (1937–41); Northern Command (1930–37); New Zealand Tunnelling Company (1915–16)
- Conflicts: Second Boer War; First World War; Western Front; Second World War; Home Front
- Awards: Knight Commander of the Order of the British Empire; Companion of the Order of the Bath; Distinguished Service Order; Mentioned in Despatches

Major General Sir John Evelyn Duigan, KBE, CB, DSO (30 March 1883 – 9 January 1950) was an officer who served with the New Zealand Military Forces during the First and Second World Wars. He was Chief of the General Staff of the New Zealand Military Forces from 1937 to 1941.

Born in Wanganui, New Zealand, in 1883, Duigan joined a unit of colonial volunteers during the Boer War. He was wounded and repatriated to New Zealand, but later returned to South Africa with the 10th New Zealand Contingent. After the war, he joined the New Zealand Military Forces as a professional soldier. During the First World War, he commanded the New Zealand Tunnelling Company and was awarded the Distinguished Service Order for his service. From 1917 to 1918 he served in staff and training positions. He also served in staff positions in the postwar military, eventually rising to the rank of colonel and commanding Northern Command by 1930. In 1937, he was promoted to major general and appointed the Chief of the General Staff. He oversaw a reduction in the size of the New Zealand Territorial Force and did little to prevent the New Zealand Government from directing its attention on the Royal New Zealand Air Force to the detriment of the army. Overlooked for command of the Second New Zealand Expeditionary Force, which was raised for service abroad during the Second World War, he retired from the military in 1941. He died nine years later at the age of 66.

== Early life ==
John Evelyn Duigan was born in Wanganui, New Zealand, on 30 March 1883. His father, James Duigan, worked as a miller at the time of his son's birth but later became the editor of the local newspaper. Duigan was educated at Wanganui Collegiate. After leaving school, he went to South Africa, where he joined Brabant's Horse, a local unit of colonial volunteers raised to fight in the Boer War.

Within weeks of Duigan's arrival in South Africa, he was seriously wounded during the siege of Wepener. Although he recovered, he was later injured when his horse fell on him. He was repatriated to New Zealand in December 1900 but rejoined his volunteer unit in South Africa once he had recovered. After returning to New Zealand for a second time at the end of 1901, he enlisted in the 10th Contingent, a New Zealand unit destined for service in the Boer War, as an officer. The fighting was largely over by the time the contingent arrived in mid-1902 and it saw no fighting.

== Military career ==
Duigan joined the New Zealand Military Forces in 1903 as a cadet and was commissioned as a lieutenant in the Royal New Zealand Engineers in 1905. After attending courses in England on engineering and signalling, he became an instructor at the Defence Department in Wellington. He was transferred to the New Zealand militia and then to the New Zealand Staff Corps in January 1911. From 1912, Duigan spent two years at the Staff College in Quetta, India.

=== First World War ===
In late 1914, Duigan was seconded to the New Zealand Expeditionary Force (NZEF), which was then preparing to depart for service overseas. After the NZEF reached the Middle East, Duigan suffered a nervous breakdown. He returned to New Zealand in June 1915, after a period of recuperation in England. In late 1915 he was promoted to major and appointed commander of the recently formed New Zealand Tunnelling Company. The company arrived in France in March 1916 and served on the Western Front in the vicinity of Arras. In late June, Duigan was involved in a motor vehicle accident that left him in hospital for over a month. His service with the company was later recognised with an award of the Distinguished Service Order.

From 1917, Duigan held a series of staff officer positions. He had a short stint with the headquarters of the New Zealand Division, and then VI Corps. He was mentioned in despatches for his service while attached to VI Corps. By mid-1917, Duigan's health was declining and he was transferred to England for service with the New Zealand Infantry Reserve Group as brigade major. He then held an instructor position at an officers' training school in England. In March 1918, he was sent to the United States to assist in the promotion of war bonds, and returned to New Zealand in October 1918.

=== Interwar period ===
His service with the NZEF terminated, Duigan returned to the New Zealand Staff Corps. He was posted as a staff officer in the Auckland Military District, and by 1930 was in overall command of the district (later reorganised as Northern Command). The following year he was promoted to colonel. In 1935, he was awarded the King George V Silver Jubilee Medal. On 1 April 1937, Duigan was promoted to major general and appointed commandant and general officer commanding (GOC) of the New Zealand Military Forces, the first New Zealand-born soldier to achieve this position. When the commandant and GOC role was restructured shortly after commencement of his term, he remained in the senior leadership role in the New Zealand Military Forces as its first Chief of the General Staff (CGS). He was also appointed a Companion of the Order of the Bath.

As CGS, Duigan proved to be an undistinguished appointment and was not particularly well regarded by the politicians of the day. He implemented several organisational changes, one of which was the disestablishment of the GOC position and its replacement with an army board to control the military. When the board was established in November 1937, it included Fred Jones, the Minister of Defence, and Duigan as first military member. Duigan offered little counter to the favouring of the fledgling Royal New Zealand Air Force by the New Zealand Government of the time, and this affected morale within the army.

One of Duigan's most significant changes resulted in the downsizing of the Territorial Force (TF), which was already in a state of decline. Current recruitment was insufficient to support the theoretical infantry division and three mounted rifle brigades that the TF mobilisation plans called for. Duigan downsized the division to a brigade group and three lots of fortress troops centred around Auckland, Wellington, and Lyttelton. Many infantry regiments were disbanded and reconstituted as battalions, while the mounted regiments were each reduced to the size of a squadron. Several senior officers were placed in retirement as well. The morale of the TF declined as the remaining senior officers raised concerns—disregarded by Duigan—over the state of the army. Four TF colonels publicly protested the reforms in the press in what became known as the Four Colonels' Revolt. This was a breach of military regulations, which prohibited military personnel from communicating with journalists unless they had permission to do so. Instead of a court-martial, which he feared would generate public sympathy for the colonels, Duigan placed all four officers on the retired list as punishment. The revolt did result in greater public awareness of the poor state of New Zealand's military but little was done to rectify the situation.

=== Second World War ===
Following the outbreak of the Second World War, Duigan desired command of the Second New Zealand Expeditionary Force (2NZEF), which was to be raised for service in Europe. Lack of command experience and his performance as CGS meant that he was not a popular choice within the military or the New Zealand Government. Major General Bernard Freyberg was instead appointed commander of 2NZEF, and Duigan's term as CGS was extended. Throughout 1940, Duigan worked to ensure the continued support and reinforcement of 2NZEF, and oversaw the reintroduction of conscription. He also attended defence conferences in Singapore and India, and made tours of the 2NZEF while it was in the Middle East.

== Later life ==
Duigan retired from the military in May 1941, having been appointed a Knight Commander of the Order of the British Empire in the 1940 King's Birthday Honours. He died in Havelock North on 9 January 1950, survived by his second wife, who he had married in 1947, and two sons from his first marriage (which ended upon the death of his wife in 1940). A third son, also from his first marriage, was killed while serving with the Royal Air Force during the Second World War.

== Notes ==
Military offices
Preceded by Major General Sir William Sinclair-Burgess; As Commandant New Zealand Military Forces	Chief of the General Staff; 1 April 1937 – 31 May 1941	Succeeded by Lieutenant General Edward Puttick
