= Maximilian Jais =

German Nazi general

- Born: 4 March 1891
- Died: 24 January 1957 (aged 65)
- Military career
- Allegiance: Nazi Germany
- Branch: Army
- Rank: Generalmajor
- Conflicts: World War II
- Awards: Knight's Cross of the Iron Cross

Maximilian Josef Franz Xaver Jais (4 March 1891 – 24 January 1957) was a German military officer who served as a Generalmajor in the Wehrmacht during World War II. A career soldier, he fought on the Western Front in World War I before serving in the invasion of Crete, the northern Eastern Front on the Kola Peninsula, and the final defence of the Westwall in 1944–1945.

== Early life and World War I ==
Jais was born in Munich, Kingdom of Bavaria, on 4 March 1891. He entered military service on 1 October 1912 as a one-year volunteer (Einjährig-Freiwilliger) in the 7th Bavarian Field Artillery Regiment. After completing his volunteer year, he was discharged to the reserve.

With the outbreak of World War I, Jais was mobilised and served with artillery units on the Western Front. He was commissioned as Leutnant der Reserve on 15 February 1915 and promoted to Oberleutnant der Reserve on 15 March 1918. During the war, he was awarded both classes of the Iron Cross (1914) and the Wound Badge in Black.

== Interwar period ==
Following the armistice, Jais was discharged on 3 January 1919 but was reactivated in the newly formed Reichswehr on 5 May 1919 with the rank of Oberleutnant. He continued his military career during the Weimar Republic, being promoted to Hauptmann on 1 February 1927 and Major on 1 September 1934. With the expansion of the Wehrmacht under the Nazi regime, he was promoted to Oberstleutnant on 1 March 1937.

At the outbreak of World War II in September 1939, Jais was assigned to the staff of Military District Command XVIII (Salzburg). From January to June 1940, he served as Commander of the High Mountain Firing School (Hochgebirgs-Schießschule) in Salzburg.

== World War II ==
=== Early commands ===
In mid-1940, Jais received his promotion to Oberst (1 March 1940) and held a succession of regimental commands: the 104th Rifle Regiment (June–December 1940) and the 331st Infantry Regiment (December 1940 – April 1941). On 8 April 1941, he was appointed commander of Gebirgsjäger-Regiment 141, part of the 6th Mountain Division.

=== Battle of Crete ===
For the forthcoming invasion of Crete, Gebirgsjäger-Regiment 141 was detached from the 6th Mountain Division and attached to the 5th Mountain Division under Generalmajor Julius Ringel. Operation Mercury, launched on 20 May 1941, was the first predominantly airborne invasion in military history, with Fallschirmjäger parachute and glider troops attempting to seize the island's airfields against determined Allied and Greek defenders.

After the paratroopers suffered severe casualties on the first day and Maleme airfield was secured on the second, mountain troops including Jais's regiment were airlifted in as reinforcements. By 25 May, elements of the regiment had been committed to the fighting around the Galatas position. On 27 May, the regiment advanced along the coast road east of Chania, where its I Battalion was engaged in fierce close-quarters combat by the New Zealand 28th (Māori) Battalion in an action known as the Battle of 42nd Street. Ringel subsequently ordered the 85th and 141st Mountain Regiments to push eastward toward Souda Bay, driving the Allied forces into retreat toward the south coast evacuation points.

Following the Allied evacuation and the fall of Crete on 1 June 1941, Jais was mentioned in the Wehrmachtbericht on 11 June 1941 and was awarded the Knight's Cross of the Iron Cross on 17 September 1941.

=== Eastern Front ===
After Crete, Gebirgsjäger-Regiment 141 deployed with the 6th Mountain Division to the Kola Peninsula on the northern sector of the Eastern Front, operating in the Lapland region during the autumn and winter of 1941. Jais was relieved of his regimental command on 5 December 1941 and placed in the Führer-Reserve of the OKH, where he remained until April 1943.

He was promoted to Generalmajor on 1 October 1942 while still in the reserve pool.

=== Divisional commands (1943–1944) ===
Returning to active duty, Jais commanded several rear-area and training divisions:

- Commander of Division 188 (1 April – 8 October 1943)
- Commander of the 188th Reserve Mountain Division (8–20 October 1943)
- Commander of Division 418 (1 November 1943 – 20 March 1944)

After a further period in the Führer-Reserve (March–May 1944), Jais was appointed Wehrmacht-Kommandant of Luxembourg on 1 May 1944.

=== Division Jais ===
Jais was immediately tasked with organising an emergency formation from replacement army (Ersatzheer) units of Wehrkreis XII (Wiesbaden).

Initially designated Division Castorf, the formation was redesignated Division (Kampfgruppe) Jais by 10 September 1944. It was assembled from Walküre (Valkyrie) emergency mobilisation units and comprised three regimental battle groups (Regiments Loft, Wegelein, and Gombel), a two-company alarm unit from the Wiesbaden military district, and a two-battery artillery detachment (Artillerie-Abteilung Weyrich). Regiment Wegelein was formed from cadres of the Army NCO School (Heeresunteroffizierschule) at Saarlautern.

The division was subordinated to LXXX Army Corps, under the 7th Army, Army Group B, and deployed to the Eifel region around Trier and Prüm to defend the Westwall.

With the exception of Regiment Wegelein, the division's units were absorbed by the 7th Army to reconstitute the 91st Infantry Division and its Grenadier Regiments 1057 and 1058; the original 91st had been destroyed in the Normandy campaign in June 1944.

Jais himself continued to serve as Commander of Abschnittskommando (Section-Command) Jais at the Westwall from September 1944 until the end of the war in May 1945.

=== Capture ===
Jais appears in U.S. Army Signal Corps archival footage filmed on 16 April 1945 at Sundwig/Hemer in the Sauerland, during the final collapse of the Ruhr pocket. The footage, which documents the U.S. 99th Infantry Division capturing approximately 6,000 German personnel in the area, shows Jais alongside Generalarbeitsführer Paul Hoppenrath of the Reich Labour Service and Generalmajor Robert Eimler. His formal entry into captivity is recorded as May 1945.

== Awards and decorations ==
- Knight's Cross of the Iron Cross on 17 September 1941 as Oberst and commander of Gebirgsjäger-Regiment 141
