= Edward Puttick =

New Zealand military officer (1890–1976)

Sir Edward Puttick
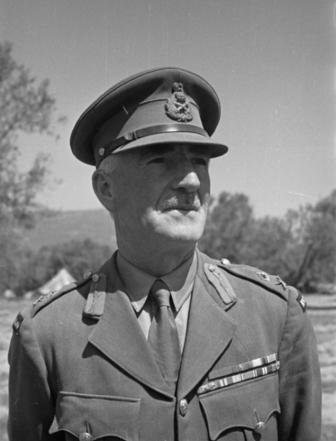
- Lieutenant General Edward Puttick in Italy, May 1944
- Born: 26 June 1890; Timaru, New Zealand
- Died: 25 July 1976 (aged 86); Hamilton, New Zealand
- Burial place: Karori Cemetery, Wellington, New Zealand
- Military career
- Allegiance: New Zealand
- Branch: New Zealand Military Forces
- Service years: 1911–46
- Rank: Lieutenant General
- Commands: Chief of the General Staff (1941–45); 2nd New Zealand Division (1941); 4th Infantry Brigade (1939–41); Central Military District (1939); Fiji Expeditionary Force (1920); 3rd Battalion, New Zealand Rifle Brigade (1917–18); 1st Battalion, New Zealand Rifle Brigade (1917)
- Conflicts: First World War; Senussi campaign; Western Front; Second World War; Battle of Greece; Battle of Crete; Home Front
- Awards: Knight Commander of the Order of the Bath; Distinguished Service Order & Bar; Mentioned in Despatches (3)

Lieutenant General Sir Edward Puttick, KCB, DSO & Bar (26 June 1890 – 25 July 1976) was an officer who served with the New Zealand Military Forces during the First and Second World Wars. The first New Zealand-born soldier to reach the rank of lieutenant general, he was Chief of the General Staff of the New Zealand Military Forces from 1941 to 1945.

Born in 1890 in Timaru, Puttick served in the Territorial Force prior to the First World War. In August 1914 he was part of the Expeditionary Force that occupied German Samoa. He later served with the New Zealand Rifle Brigade during the Senussi campaign and on the Western Front. He was commanding the 3rd Battalion of the brigade in March 1918 when he was wounded and later repatriated to New Zealand.

Puttick joined the New Zealand Staff Corps in 1919 and held a number of command and staff positions for the next 20 years. During the Second World War, he commanded the 4th Infantry Brigade in the Battle of Greece, for which he was awarded a bar to the Distinguished Service Order he had won in the previous war. Following the Allied evacuation from Greece he commanded the 2nd New Zealand Division during the subsequent Battle of Crete. In September he returned to New Zealand as Chief of General Staff, New Zealand Military Forces, and served in this capacity until late 1945. He retired from the military the following year and died in 1976.

== Early life ==
The son of a railway worker from London, Edward Puttick was born in Timaru, in South Canterbury. He was educated at Waitaki Boys' High School, after which he joined the Roads Department, as it was then known, as a draughtsman. He joined the newly formed Territorial Force in 1911, serving as a second lieutenant in the 15th (North Auckland) Regiment. The following year he moved to Wellington and was transferred to the 5th (Wellington) Regiment.

== First World War ==
Following the outbreak of the First World War in the summer of 1914, Puttick's territorial regiment was designated part of the Samoa Expeditionary Force, which was raised for the Occupation of German Samoa in early August 1914. Now with the rank of captain, he landed at Apia on 29 August. The occupation was achieved without loss of life and he spent the next several months on garrison duty before returning to New Zealand in April 1915. On his return, he volunteered for the New Zealand Expeditionary Force (NZEF) which was then in the Middle East, preparing for the Gallipoli campaign.

On arrival in Egypt, Puttick was posted to the 1st Battalion, New Zealand Rifle Brigade. He commanded 'B' Company of the battalion during the Senussi Campaign from January to February 1916, before being transferred to the 2nd Infantry Brigade of the newly formed New Zealand Division. He was promoted to major and appointed Staff Captain of the brigade, under the command of Brigadier General William Braithwaite. He went with the division to the Western Front in April and remained with the brigade during its settling in period in the Armentieres sector of the front. In July, prior to the start of the Somme Offensive, he was transferred back to the Rifle Brigade, and appointed second-in-command of its 4th Battalion.

Puttick fought in the Battle of Flers-Courcelette in mid-September 1916 and was mentioned in despatches for his leadership and support of his battalion commander, Colonel Charles Melvill, immediately following the battle. In December he temporarily commanded the 4th Battalion while Melvill was briefly commander of the 2nd Infantry Brigade. In June 1917 he had an extended period as temporary commander of the battalion when, during the Battle of Messines, Melvill was promoted to command of the 1st Infantry Brigade following the death of its previous commander, Brigadier General Charles Henry Brown. Puttick led the battalion through the Battle of Passchendaele until November 1917 at which time he was given command of the 3rd Battalion, New Zealand Rifle Brigade. Late in the year he was again mentioned in despatches and on 1 January 1918, in recognition of his service in the previous six months, he was awarded the Distinguished Service Order (DSO).

On 21 March 1918, the Germans began their Spring Offensive and the New Zealand Division was rushed to plug a gap in the front near Colincamps. On 27 March, Puttick was wounded in the chest while leading his battalion in an action designed to link up with an Australian brigade in the nearby village of Hébuterne. He was evacuated to England for treatment and after recuperating, commanded the New Zealand Rifle Brigade's training camp in Brocton, Staffordshire. However, his wounds were such that he was eventually repatriated to New Zealand at the end of the war.

== Interwar period ==
Shortly after Puttick's return to New Zealand, he married Irene Lillian Dignan in Auckland. The couple had three daughters. After being discharged from the NZEF in March 1919, he rejoined the Roads Department. Later that year he applied to join New Zealand's permanent military forces but was declined. He returned to the Roads Department but was seconded to the military in August 1919. A few months later he received a commission in the New Zealand Staff Corps as a major.

In 1920, Puttick was appointed commander of the Fiji Expeditionary Force, which had been raised following a request from the Fijian government for military forces to support local police dealing with striking labourers and farmers. The force, numbering about 55 men, was based in Fiji for two months before returning home. He then served in a number of staff positions. He was sent to England for attachment to the War Office and the same year attended the Imperial Defence College in 1937, with the rank of colonel. He was also one of New Zealand's representatives at the coronation of King George VI and Queen Elizabeth in Westminster Abbey. In 1938 he was appointed as Adjutant General of the New Zealand Military Forces as well as a second term as Quartermaster General, having previously served in this capacity from 1934 to 1936.

== Second World War ==
Puttick was commanding the Central Military District when the Second World War broke out and, as a skilled administrator, played a key role in the raising of the Second New Zealand Expeditionary Force (2NZEF) for service overseas. The 4th Infantry Brigade with Puttick, promoted to temporary brigadier, as its commander was to be the first brigade of the newly formed 2nd New Zealand Division, under the overall command of Major General Bernard Freyberg. The brigade duly departed for the Middle East in January 1940.

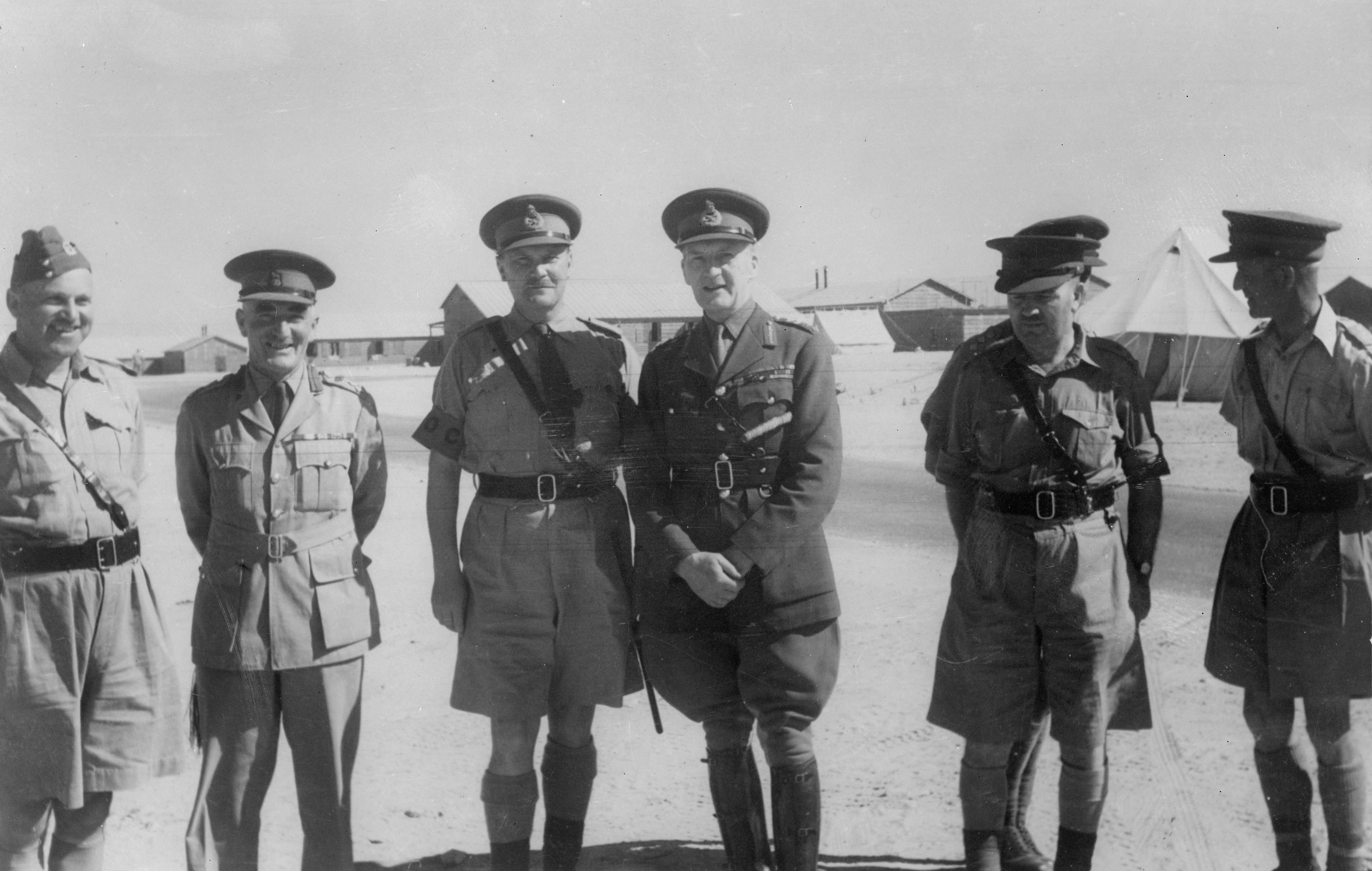
General Sir John Dill, British Chief of the Imperial General Staff, visits Maadi Camp, Egypt. From left to right: Brigadiers R. Miles and E. Puttick, Major General Freyberg and General Dill, Brigadiers J. Hargest and H. E. Barrowclough.

Puttick oversaw the training of the brigade once it settled in its base in Egypt. In June 1940, Freyberg travelled to England to where the second infantry brigade of the division had been shipped. In his absence, Puttick was temporary commander of the New Zealand forces in Egypt. Anticipating a German invasion of Greece, the division was one of the Allied units transferred to that country. Arriving in April 1941, he led the brigade competently during the Battle of Greece as it retreated from the Aliakmon Line in northern Greece to the Servia Pass and onto the beaches at Porto Rafti from where it was evacuated on 27 April to Crete. He was later awarded a Bar to his DSO for his "gallantry and devotion to duty" during this period.

On Crete, Puttick was promoted to temporary major general and, following Freyberg's appointment as the commander of Creforce, took over responsibility for the 2nd New Zealand Division. During the Battle of Crete his failure to pressure James Hargest, one of his brigade commanders, to make a counterattack to support the defenders of Maleme airfield resulted in its eventual loss to the Germans. With reinforcements and supplies landed at the airfield the Germans were able to consolidate the tenuous gains made in the opening days of the invasion. Any meaningful chance of the Allies successfully preventing the capture of the island was lost and the survivors of Creforce were eventually evacuated to Egypt.

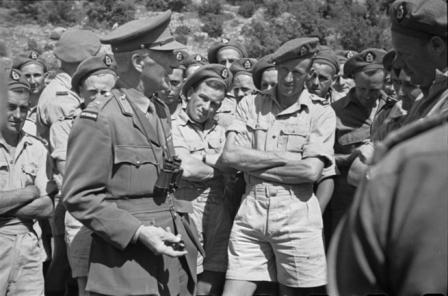
Lieutenant General Edward Puttick in the Volturno Valley area in Italy, talking with men of the Supply and Petrol Companies, 2nd New Zealand Division, 30 May 1944.

On his return to Egypt, Puttick was offered the opportunity to become Chief of the General Staff, effectively the commander of the New Zealand Military Forces, by the visiting New Zealand prime minister, Peter Fraser. He accepted the role and returned to New Zealand in September 1941. Puttick's focus was on ensuring the manpower of the 2NZEF in North Africa was adequately maintained by reinforcements. In the face of the increasing threat of the Japanese Empire in the Pacific, he also put considerable effort into improving New Zealand's defences. After the Japanese entered the war, he considered the actual threat of invasion to be minimal but continued to encourage improvements in home defence as a means of boosting morale.

In April 1942 Puttick was promoted to lieutenant general, the first New Zealand-born soldier to reach this rank. In the 1942 King's Birthday Honours, he was appointed a Companion of the Order of the Bath (CB). As the war progressed he was faced with the difficulty of juggling resources to maintain both the 2nd New Zealand Division in the Middle East and the 3rd New Zealand Division in the Pacific theatre. Later in the war, he was in favour keeping the 2nd Division in Italy to deal with what he considered to be the greater priority, the defeat of Germany, rather than have it be used against the Japanese.

== Later life ==
Puttick was succeeded as Chief of the General Staff by Major General Norman Weir in late 1945 and was appointed a Knight Commander of the Order of the Bath in the 1946 New Year Honours. In June 1946, he led the New Zealand contingent at the Victory Parade in London. He retired from the military three months later.

In his retirement, Puttick authored one of the volumes of the Official History of New Zealand in the Second World War 1939–45, a unit history of the 25th Battalion, which was published in 1960. His wife died in 1964 and in his later years, he lived in Raglan, a small seaside town on the west coast of the North Island. He died on 25 July 1976 in Hamilton, survived by his three daughters, and was buried at Karori Cemetery in Wellington with military honours.

== Notes ==
Military offices
Preceded by Major General John Evelyn Duigan	Chief of the General Staff; September 1941 – December 1945	Succeeded by Major General Norman Weir
