= 9th Brigade (New Zealand) =

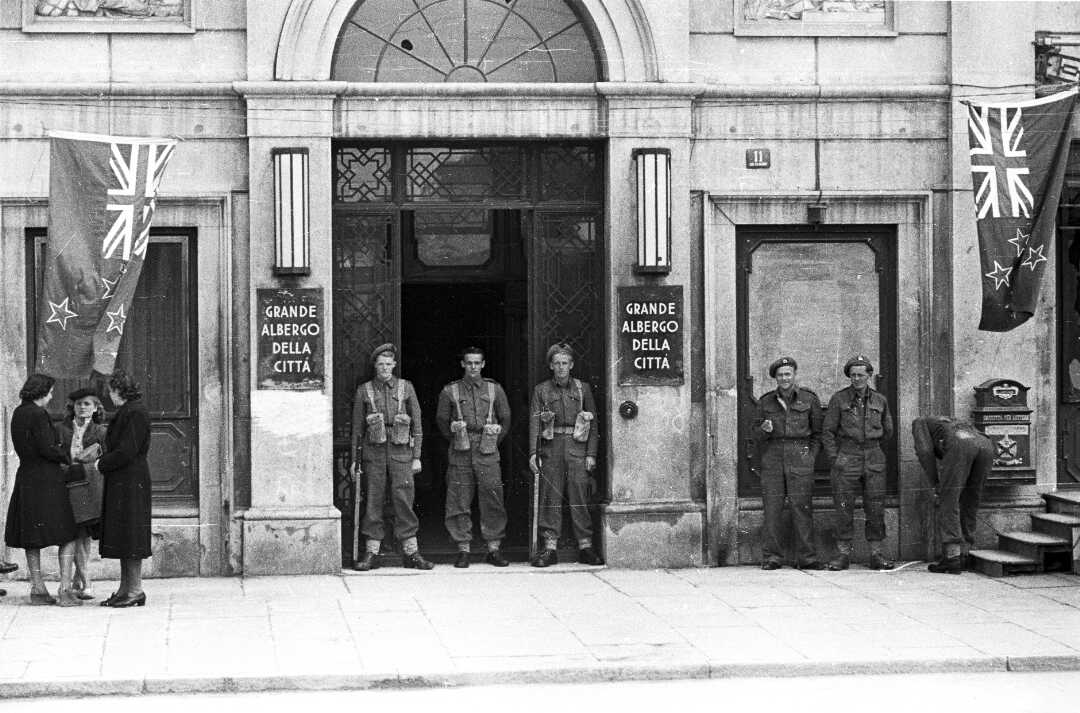
- 9th Brigade Headquarters in Trieste, Italy, 1945
- Active: 1945–1948
- Country: New Zealand
- Branch: New Zealand Military Forces
- Type: Infantry
- Size: Brigade
- Part of: 2nd New Zealand Division
- Engagements: Italian Campaign; Occupation of Japan

Commanders
- Notable commanders: William Gentry; Leslie Potter

The 9th Brigade was a formation of the New Zealand Military Forces raised for service in Italy during the Second World War. As part of the 2nd New Zealand Division, it participated in Operation Grapeshot in 1945. It then provided the basis of J Force, the New Zealand contribution to the British Commonwealth Occupation Force.

== History ==
=== Deception formation ===
9th Brigade was initially formed only "on paper" as part of the Operation Cascade deception scheme in 1942. The New Zealand Headquarters at Maadi Camp was allocated the deception identity "HQ 6 NZ Division," while the NZ Infantry Training Depot became notionally "9 NZ Infantry Brigade;" and the Northern, Central, and Southern Companies became 31, 32, and 33 "Battalions." The deception identities lasted until 1944.

=== Formation ===
The brigade was formed as a real formation for the first time in Italy in early 1945 for service in the last stages of the campaign and placed under the command of Brigadier William Gentry. The Divisional Cavalry Regiment, 22nd (Motor) Battalion and the 27th (Machine Gun) Battalion became the brigade's three battalions. All three units lost their respective specialist roles and were reorganised as regular infantry battalions. (Note: Although the Divisional Cavalry was reorganised and retitled as a battalion, rather than a regiment, it would retain the cavalry terms of squadron and troop for company and platoon respectively) During the final offensive in Italy in April 1945, a number of additional units were also temporarily placed under the direct command of 9th Brigade. These units included 19th Armoured Regiment (equipped with Sherman tanks); C squadron, 4th Hussars (Kangaroo armoured personnel carriers); and 31 Battery, 7th Anti-Tank Regiment (M10 Tank Destroyers and towed 17-pounder anti tanks guns).

=== World War II ===
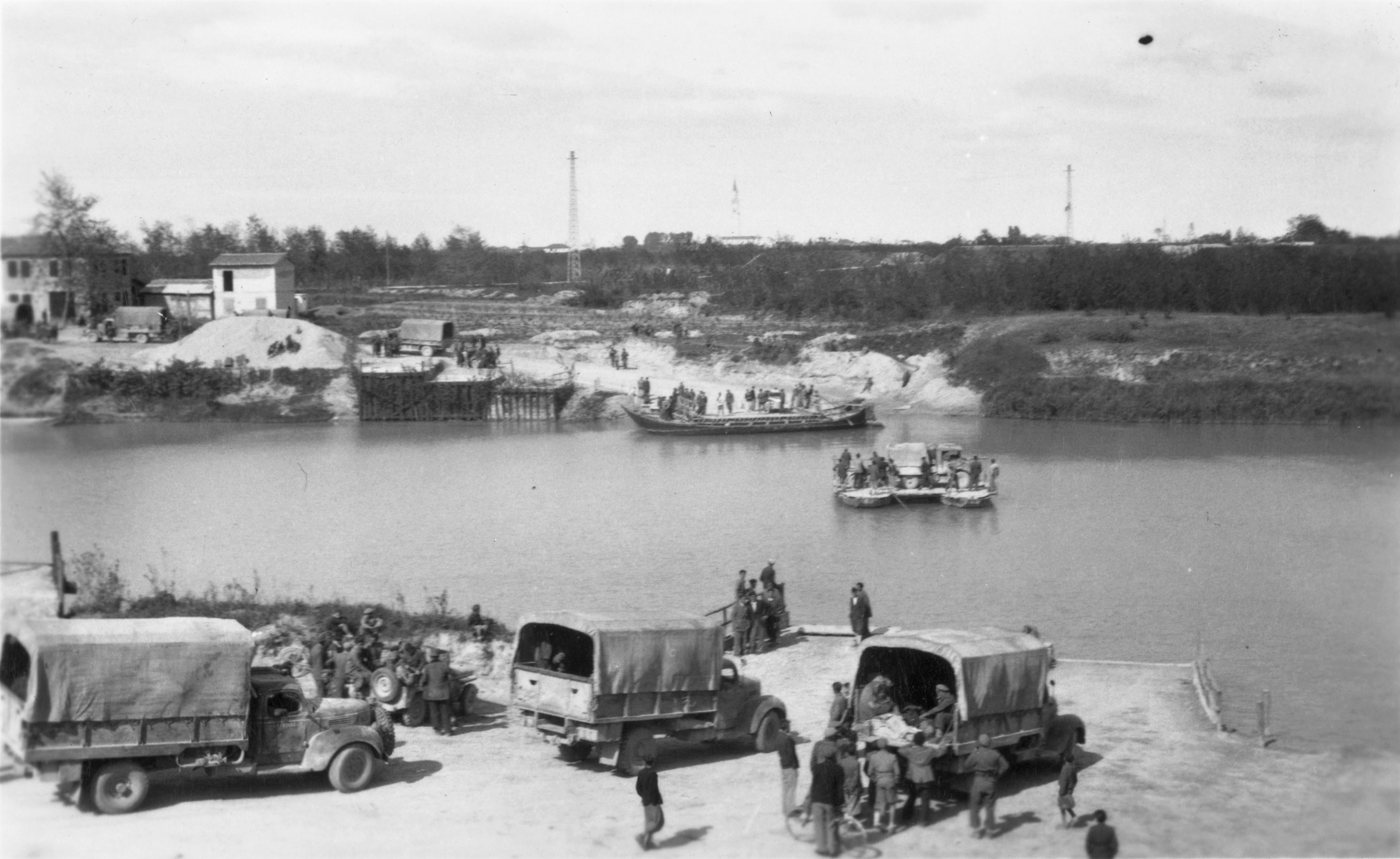
22nd Battalion crossing the Piave River, April 1945

The first engagement of the 9th Brigade was during Operation Buckland in which the British 8th Army intended to cross the Senio river and advance into the Po Valley. The operation was part of a much larger Allied offensive into northern Italy. The attack by the 2nd New Zealand division began on the evening of 9 April 1945. 5th and 6th Brigades, supported by flame-thrower tanks of 51st Royal Tank Regiment, attacked across the Senio river, capturing a bridgehead. The next morning, 9th Brigade sent 27th battalion (in Kangaroos and supported by tanks of 19th Armoured Regiment) to cross the Seino and capture the town of Cotignola, linking the respective bridgeheads held by the New Zealanders and the 8th Indian division on their right flank. By the end of the day the remainder of the Brigade had crossed and the New Zealanders had advanced six miles to the Santerno river. 9th Brigade would remain in reserve until the 13 April when it relieved 5th Brigade and took up the advance on the division's left. The brigade advanced in Kangaroos and completed occupation of the far bank of the Sillaro river by the morning of the 15th. The advance of the brigade was only limited by the rate at which the canals and drains could be bridged so that the accompanying kangaroos and Shermans could cross. The brigade reached Villa Fontana on the 17th and then attacked across the Gaiana on the evening of 18th. 9th Brigade's attack was preceded by an unprecedented barrage of 72,500 artillery shells and supported by flame-throwing tanks. The Divisional Cavalry and 22nd Battalion led the attack and by morning had both reached their respective objectives. The brigade would advance another two miles beyond the Gaiana until it was relieved by 5th Brigade on the night of 19/20 April. During the period 13–19 April the casualties of 9th Brigade were 80 killed and 317 wounded, while 747 enemy prisoners had been captured.

The brigade returned to the front on 27 April, by which time the Allies had crossed the river Po and bridged the Adige. 9th Brigade passed through 6th Brigade and rapidly advanced eastwards facing little resistance. It reached Mestre by the 28th, crossed the Piave river on the 30th and arrived in Trieste in the afternoon of 2 May, the German surrender in Italy having come into effect at midday.

=== Postwar ===
Following the unconditional surrender of Japan, the brigade formed the basis of J Force, the New Zealand contribution to the British Commonwealth Occupation Force. 9th Brigade arrived in Japan in March 1946 and was assigned to occupation duties in the Yamaguchi Prefecture. In July, Gentry was replaced as commander by Leslie Potter, who would retain command until the disbandment of J force (except for a brief period in 1947 when he was on leave). A composite Guard Battalion was regularly formed from a company drawn from each of the brigade's three battalions and a fourth from supporting units (which occasionally included RNZAF and RAAF detachments). The Guard battalion carried out both ceremonial and non-ceremonial guard duties at a number of government sites in Tokyo, including the Imperial Palace. 9th Brigade was disbanded when J Force was withdrawn in September 1948.

== Distinguishing Patch ==
The distinguishing patch of 9th Brigade was a red diamond worn on the left shoulder. In 1947 the 22nd and 27th battalions were respectively designated as the 2nd and 3rd battalions of the New Zealand Regiment. The red diamond continued to be worn by these battalions, although they were subsequently disbanded in 1948. The patch returned when the 2nd battalion was reformed in 1959 and from 1964 was worn as a dress distinction for personnel posted to 1st and 2/1st battalions of the Royal New Zealand Infantry Regiment. Since 2007 the patch has been awarded to all personnel who successfully complete combat corps training.

== Notes ==
Footnotes

Citations
