= New Zealand Service Medal 1946–1949 =

- Obverse (top left) and reverse (top right) of the medal. Ribbon: 32mm, white with a central red stripe and black stripes at the edges.
- Type: Campaign medal
- Awarded for: Campaign service.
- Description: Rhodium plated steel disk, 38mm diameter.
- Presented by: New Zealand
- Eligibility: New Zealand forces, merchant navy, civil airline crews, and civilians.
- Campaign(s): Occupied Japan 1945–49.
- Clasps: None authorised.
- Established: 3 Nov 1995
- Total: 4,700

The New Zealand Service Medal 1946–1949 is a New Zealand campaign medal for service in Occupied Japan at the end of World War II.

The medal was instituted in 1995 to recognise New Zealand military personnel who served in the occupation forces in Japan between March 1946 and March 1949. In 2002 the Royal Warrant was amended to also recognise service between September 1945 and March 1946, including service by the crews of HMNZS Gambia and HMNZS Achilles in Japanese waters.

The medal was awarded to all those, military or civilian, who served with the occupation forces.

- Members of the armed services were required to have completed 28 days of service in Japan,
- Members of the New Zealand Merchant Navy were required to have spent an aggregate of 28 days in Japanese territory or territorial waters, working with or alongside a New Zealand government contribution to the occupation forces,
- Aircrew of civilian airlines incorporated in New Zealand were required to have completed an aggregate of 48 flying hours in Japanese airspace,
- Civilians qualified if they had spent 28 days in Japan working with or alongside a New Zealand government contribution to the occupation forces.

Service terminated by death, wounds or disability due to service, withdrawal at the direction of the New Zealand Government for official reasons, or the award of a Royal Honour for gallantry, bravery, or meritorious service, qualified for the award of the medal, regardless of whether the length of service requirement had been met.

Since 1995 this medal has been issued to over 4,700 veterans or their families. About 13,000 New Zealanders, including several hundred women, are eligible for this medal.

== Clasps ==
None authorised

== See also ==
- British Commonwealth Occupation Force

== Bibliography ==
- Mackay, J and Mussel, J (eds) – Medals Yearbook – 2005, (2004), Token Publishing.
- Laurie Brocklebank, Jayforce: New Zealand and the Military Occupation of Japan 1945–48, Auckland: Oxford University Press, 1997.
- Ian McGibbon (editor), The Oxford Companion to New Zealand Military History, Auckland: Oxford University Press, 2000, pp. 256–258.
