= New Zealand Staff Corps =

- Active: 1911–1947
- Disbanded: 1947
- Country: New Zealand
- Branch: New Zealand Military Forces
- Type: Staff
- Size: ~100

The New Zealand Staff Corps was a corps of professional officers in the regular New Zealand Military Forces which, in peacetime, administered the Territorial Force. During the First and Second World Wars, many members of the corps commanded battalions and brigades in the New Zealand Expeditionary Forces sent overseas. The corps was disbanded in 1947.

== Background ==
For much of the 19th century, New Zealand lacked a modern army. By the mid-1880s, following a series of "Russian Scares", in which it was feared Russia was the most likely military threat to the country, the forerunner to the New Zealand Military Forces, the New Zealand Permanent Force, was established. (Note: The New Zealand Army did not exist as a formal entity until the passing of the New Zealand Army Act in 1950.) The Permanent Force numbered no more than a few hundred men at any one time, and New Zealand's local defence needs depended on the militia, known as the Volunteer Force.

The Volunteer Force had a number of defects, the first of which was the quality of its men. Although they funded their own equipment and trained on their own time, the equipment was often of low quality and time spent training was insufficient. Officers were elected by their men but generally lacked professional military training, and were often compromised when giving orders to men that elected them to command. Co-operation between the Volunteer Force and the Permanent Force was lacking. By 1905, the constraints of New Zealand society and increasing work commitments began to impact on the number of willing volunteers. The commandant of the New Zealand Military Forces at the time, Major General James Melville Babington, considered the Volunteer Forces to be an inefficient fighting force.

Following the Imperial Defence Conference in 1909, it was recognised there was a need for increased military cooperation between the Dominions of the British Empire. Each Dominion was expected to be capable of raising an expeditionary force with units organised along the lines of the British Army. It was quite clearly apparent that the current system, based on the Volunteer Force, would fall well short of what would be required.

The passing of a new Defence Act in 1909 saw the introduction of compulsory military training and the replacement of the Volunteer Forces with a Territorial Force. Military Districts were also created, with each district having responsibility for defined areas having a specified number of Territorial Force units. This was expected to considerably increase New Zealand's military capability to around 30,000 men, with 10,000 being able to rapidly mobilise as an expeditionary force in an emergency.

== Formation and military service ==
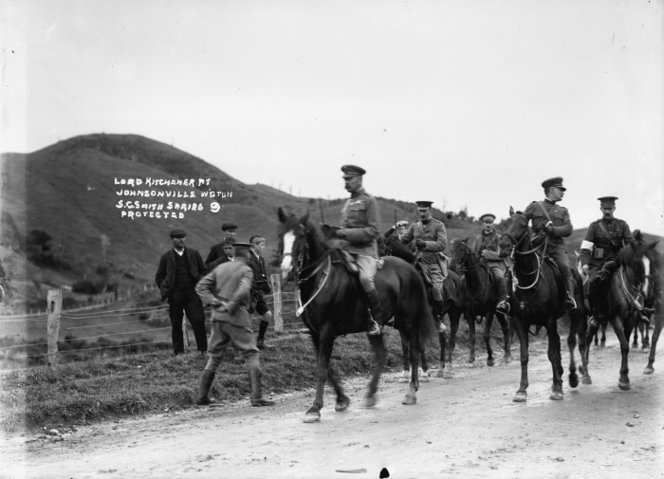
Lord Kitchener on horseback at Johnsonville, during his inspection tour of New Zealand, February 1910

In 1910, Lord Kitchener was invited by the New Zealand government to visit and advise on the country's defence arrangements. At the conclusion of his visit he made a number of recommendations, one of which was the establishment of a New Zealand Staff Corps. This corps was to consist of a cadre of regular officers of the New Zealand Permanent Forces which would provide professional guidance and administration of the units of the newly formed Territorial Force. At the time, the New Zealand Permanent Forces had no more than 30 officers. This was insufficient for the needs of the Territorial Force and it was envisaged that the Staff Corps would consist of 100 officers.

Some officers of the New Zealand Staff were to be graduates of the Royal Military College in Australia, to which ten cadets were to be sent annually. To make up the numbers, Major General Alexander Godley, the new commandant of the New Zealand Military Forces, held a training camp in early 1911. Prospective officers who had applied for the New Zealand Staff Corps were assessed and trained and eventually 41 were selected to join the 22 regular officers. Most joined Territorial units as adjutants, with some as area or military district commanders.

During the First World War, many of the officers of the Staff Corps volunteered for and served in key leadership positions in the New Zealand Expeditionary Force (NZEF), often as battalion and brigade commanders. One such officer, Charles Melvill, later rose to be commandant of the New Zealand Military Forces in 1925. However, having Staff Corps officers in command of battalions was not Godley's intention when forming the NZEF in 1914; preference was to be given to Territorial Force officers.

The deaths of several members of the corps during the war resulted in the depletion of the Staff Corps following the cessation of hostilities. To fill the gaps, many former Territorial Force officers who had acquitted themselves well with the NZEF during the war were invited to join. Budgetary cuts in 1922 reduced the corps to 75 officers, and the number of staff officers dwindled further to 55 during the 1930s. As in the previous war, many officers of the Staff Corps volunteered for the 2NZEF, serving as battalion and brigade commanders during the Second World War.

== Disbandment ==
After the war, greater integration between the professional military and the Territorial Force saw the need for the New Zealand Staff Corps diminished. It was disbanded in 1947, and training and administration of the various Territorial units devolved to officers with local units of the New Zealand Military Forces.

== Notes ==
Footnotes

Citations
