= Missiria executions =

1941 massacre on Crete, Greece

Coordinates: 35.3683°N 24.5090°E

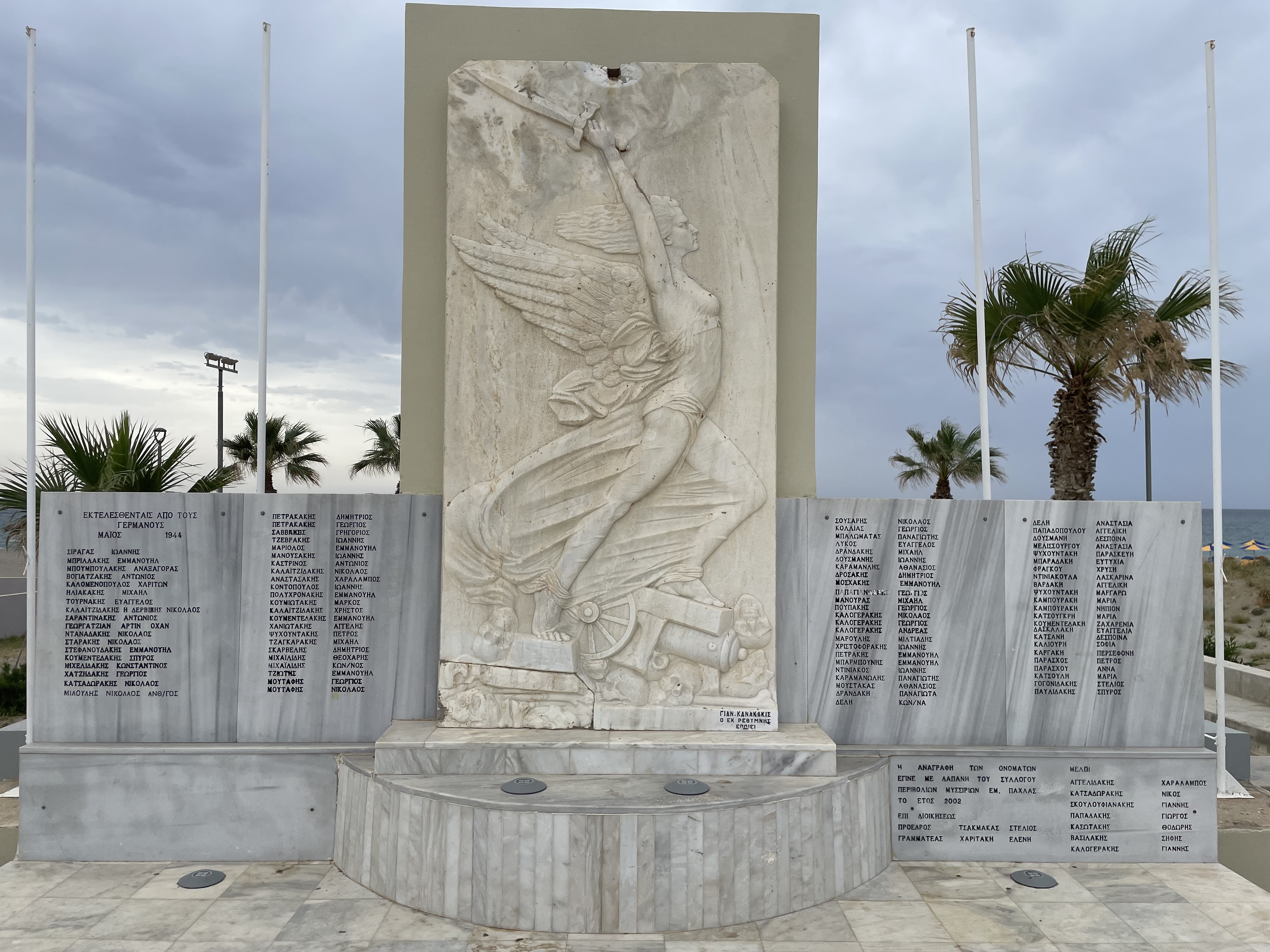
- Victims memorial
- Location: Missiria, Rethymno, Crete, Kingdom of Greece (under German occupation)
- Date: 23 & 24 May 1941
- Weapons: Machine guns and rifles
- Deaths: over 80, exact number unknown
- Perpetrator: Fallschirmjäger of 2nd Fallschirmjäger Regiment under Major Erich Schulz

The Missiria executions (Greek: Εκτελέσεις στα Μισίρια), also referred to as Perivolia executions (Greek: Εκτελέσεις στα Περιβόλια), was the mass execution by firing squad of Greek civilians on the beach of Missiria in Rethymno, Crete, Greece by German paratroopers on 23 and 24 May 1941 during World War II. The executions were ordered by Major Erich Schulz, acting commander of the 2nd Parachute Regiment, as collective punishment for the active participation of locals from the villages of Perivolia and Missiria in the Battle of Rethymno.

== Background ==
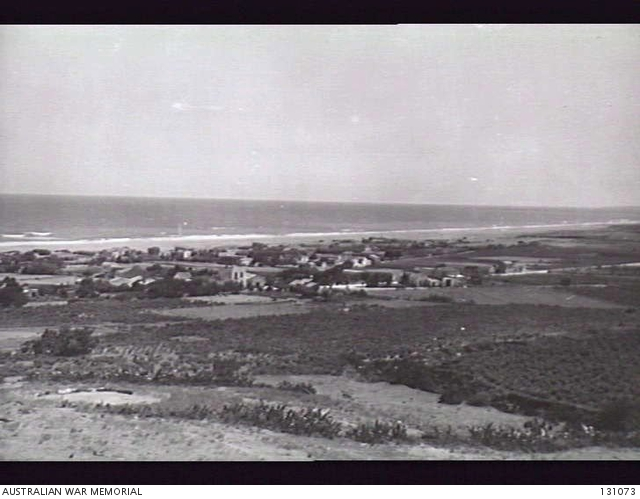
View of Perivolia from St. George's church (Hill C), May 1945.

Allied positions and German drop zones.

In late May 1941, Crete was the theatre of Operation Mercury, the first large-scale airborne invasion in military history. The German offensive had three primary targets on the island, namely the Maleme airfield and the port of Souda, the Pigi airstrip east of Rethymno, and the Heraklion airfield.

Since the available transport aircraft (Ju 52s and towed DFS 230s) were not enough to drop all paratroopers in one sortie, they were dropped in two waves. The first wave was dropped early in the morning of 20 May, targeting Maleme airfield, the city of Chania, and the port of Souda. The second wave was dropped at 4pm, focusing on capturing the airfields in Rethymno and Heraklion. Drop zones in Rethymno included Missiria and Perivolia, two neighboring settlements that have the town of Rethymno to their west and the Pigi airstrip to their east. The unit tasked with capturing Rethymno and the nearby airstrip was the 2nd Fallschirmjäger Regiment of the 7th Air Division commanded by Colonel Alfred Sturm. The town of Rethymno was defended by Australian and Greek forces under Lieutenant colonel Ian Campbell.

Allied troops fiercely resisted the German invasion, killing large numbers of paratroopers while they were still in the air. The Cretan civilians were also instrumental in defending the area, often attacking German troops with makeshift weapons. Of the initial force of approximately 1,700 soldiers, the German 2nd Parachute Regiment suffered more than 400 casualties on the first day. The day after the landing, on 21 May, Col. Sturm was captured and command of the regiment passed to Maj. Erich Schulz.

== The executions ==
According to eyewitness testimonies, on 21 May the paratroopers began arresting anyone they encountered in the area, especially men of fighting age. The captives were detained without food and water in a coffee shop and a couple of larger houses in the area. On 23 May, with the pretext of offering them tea and biscuits, the paratroopers led a group of 36 people to the beach of Missiria and executed them by firing squad. During the execution, Australian forces from the No. 6 Battery of the 2/3rd Field Regiment led by Maj. Ian Bessell-Browne and stationed on Hill B (Greek: Αργουλίδα) east of Missiria, fired some artillery shells. The paratroopers abandoned their hostages and fled to seek cover. Amidst the chaos, four men managed to crawl to the beach and escape. However, one of them was wounded in the head and later died.

The executions continued the following morning with 16 more people, among which a 90-year-old blind man, being shot and killed. About thirty more captives were executed later in the same day. Several women and underage individuals were among the victims. The bodies of those executed were subsequently thrown into a nearby well. Once the well filled up, the rest of the bodies were doused with petrol and burned.

== Aftermath ==
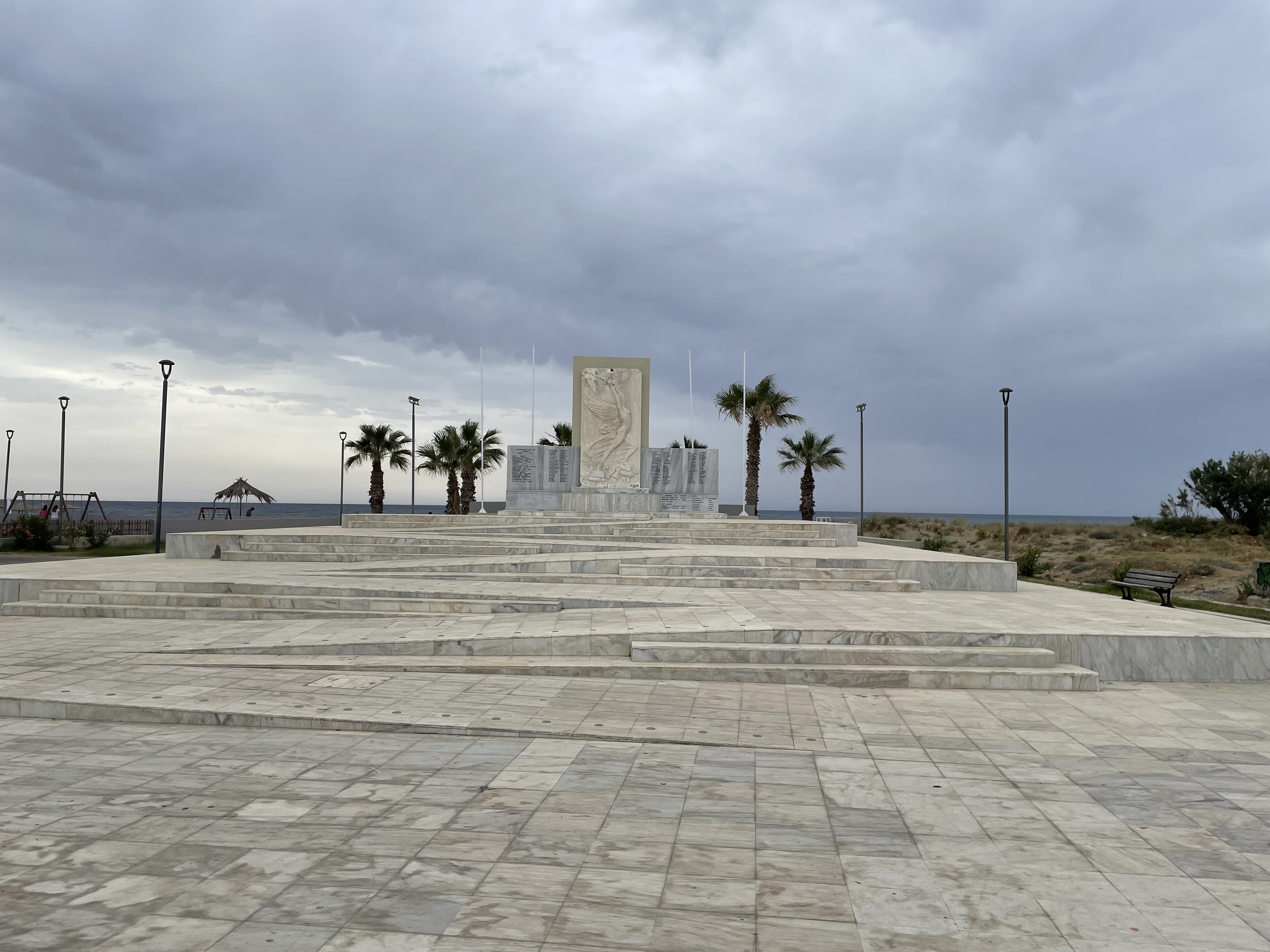
Overview of the memorial.

The exact number of those executed has not been confirmed. A memorial commemorating them has been constructed near the location of the shootings. The memorial features a marble column depicting freedom, personified as a winged woman raising a sword.

The names of victims listed on the memorial are 110, however some of them were civilians who fell in the battle. Others were executed later, like Dimitris Drosakis (Greek: Δημήτρης Δροσάκης) who was arrested in Rethymno in early June.

Erich Schulz was not accused of this war crime and his involvement in the incident is ignored in relevant historical documents.

== See also ==
- Massacre of Kondomari
- Razing of Kandanos
- Alikianos executions
