= Alikianos executions =

1941 mass shooting of Greek civilians by Nazi German paratroopers in Crete

Coordinates: 35.4535°N 23.9115°E

The Alikianos executions (Greek: εκτελέσεις στον Αλικιανό) was the mass execution by firing squad of mostly male civilians from Alikianos and nearby villages in Crete, Greece by German paratroopers on 24 May, 2 June, and 1 August 1941 during World War II. The executions were ordered by Generaloberst Kurt Student, commander of the XI Air Corps, in reprisal for the active participation of Cretan civilians in the Battle of Crete.

== Background ==
The village of Alikianos (Greek: Αλικιανός) is located on a fertile plain near the north coast of Crete, approximately 12 km (7.5 mi) southwest of the city of Chania. During the Battle of Crete, Richard Heidrich's 3rd Fallschirmjäger Regiment (FJR 3) was ordered to land on the plain and advance northwest towards the Maleme airstrip, one of the island's most strategic targets. Covering the rear of the 3rd Regiment was the 7th Engineer Battalion, dropped in the vicinity of Alikianos between the road to Chania and the bed of Keritis (Greek: Κερίτης, ancient Ιάρδανος, Iardanus) river and charged with the mission to conduct reconnaissance. The Engineer Battalion were confronted by the ill-armed and poorly trained 8th Greek Regiment, who were assisted by local irregulars. Despite being armed with primitive weapons, the locals attacked the Parachute Engineer Battalion, inflicting significant losses.

The area in and around Alikianos was the site of a fierce battle that started on 21 May, and lasted for seven days. The battle zone became known as Prison Valley owing to the presence of a prison farm that was its prominent building. The gallant defence of the 8th Greek Regiment and the local population is today credited with protecting the Allied line of retreat, making possible their safe withdrawal and subsequent evacuation from Sfakia.

== The executions ==
Infuriated by the involvement of the local population in resisting the invasion by German paratroopers and the heavy losses inflicted on them, Göring ordered General Student to launch collective punishment operations against the locals soon after the end of the Battle. Among other punitive measures, these operations prescribed summary executions.

=== 24 May 1941 ===
On 24 May 1941, while the Battle of Crete was still being fought, a German patrol arrested 6 male civilians in Alikianos. Upon discovering the dead body of a paratrooper officer, the Germans killed the hostages by firing squad. One of the hostages, Vassilis Drakakis (Βασίλης Δρακακάκης), survived the execution and the following coup de grâce but was later arrested again and shot in the third execution on 1 August 1941.

=== 2 June 1941 ===
On 2 June 1941, Alikianos was surrounded by German forces. 42 male civilians were marched to the churchyard and shot in groups of ten in front of their relatives. On the same day and during similar operations, 12 and 25 civilians were respectively executed in the nearby villages of Agia (Greek: Αγυιά) and Kyrtomado (Κυρτομάδω).

=== 1 August 1941 ===
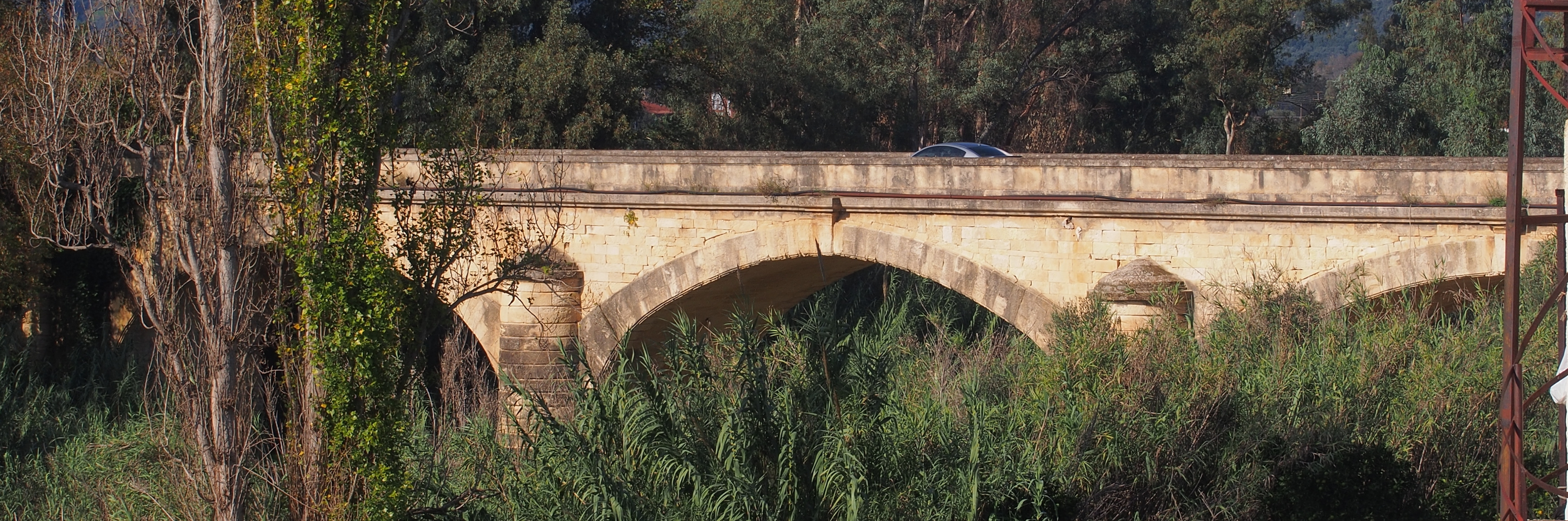
Keritis river bridge.

General Alexander Andrae, who succeeded Student as the Commander-in-Chief of Fortress Crete, continued Student's campaign of retaliations. Two months after the first execution, the Germans gathered 118 civilians at a bridge over the Keritis river near Alikianos and shot them after forcing them to dig their own graves. Twelve of those killed were from Alikianos whereas the rest came from the nearby villages Fournes (Greek: Φουρνές), Skines (Σκηνές), Vatolakos (Βατόλακκος), Koufo (Κουφό), Prases (Πρασές), Karanou (Καράνου), Lakkoi (Λάκκοι), Orthouni (Ορθούνι), Nea Roumata (Νέα Ρούματα) and Hosti (Χωστή).

== Aftermath ==
After the surrender of Germany, Student was captured by the British. In May 1947, he came before a military tribunal to answer charges of mistreatment and murder of prisoners of war by his forces in Crete. Greece's demand to have Student extradited was declined. Student was found guilty of three out of eight charges and sentenced to five years in prison. However, he was given a medical discharge and was released in 1948. Student was never tried for crimes against civilians.

Andrae was captured by the British and then extradited to Greece to be tried for war crimes he was responsible for during his time in Crete. In 1947, he was condemned to four life sentences, but after spending four years in prison, he was released in January 1952.

== Memorials ==
A monument commemorating the victims of the first execution has been erected by the church of Alikianos. A second one stands near the Keritis bridge.

== See also ==
- Massacre of Kondomari
- Razing of Kandanos
