= Massacre of Kondomari =

1941 massacre on Crete, Greece

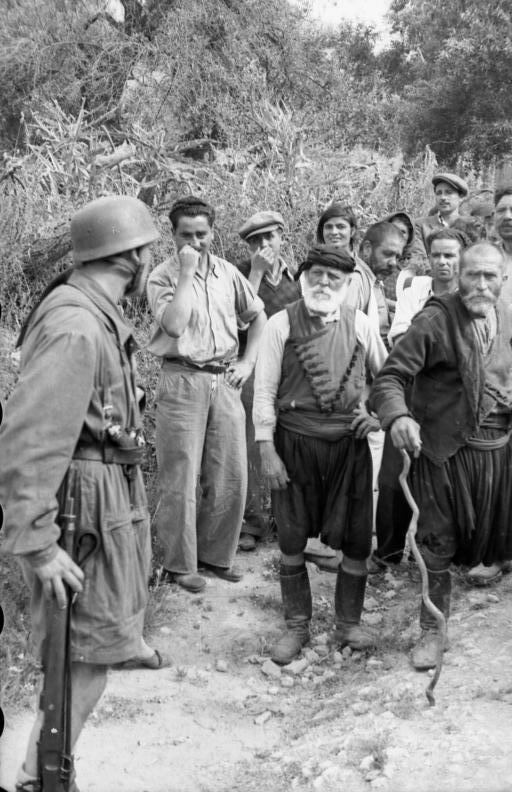
- Cretan Greek civilians confronting German Fallschirmjäger paratroopers before the killing began at Kondomari, Crete, in June 1941
- Location: 35°30′25″N 23°51′22″E; Kondomari, Chania, Crete, Kingdom of Greece (under German occupation)
- Date: 2 June 1941
- Weapons: Machine guns and rifles
- Deaths: 23 (German estimate), 60 Cretan men (other sources)
- Perpetrators: Fallschirmjäger of III Battalion of Luftlande-Sturm-Regiment under Oberleutnant Horst Trebes, following reprisal orders by Generaloberst Kurt Student

The Massacre of Kondomari (Greek: Σφαγή στο Κοντομαρί) was the execution of male civilians from the village of Kondomari in Crete by an ad hoc firing squad consisting of German paratroopers on 2 June 1941 during World War II. The shooting was the first of a series of reprisals in Crete, orchestrated by Generaloberst Kurt Student, in retaliation for the participation of Cretans in the Battle of Crete which had ended with the surrender of the island two days earlier. The massacre was photographed by Franz-Peter Weixler, a German army war propaganda correspondent, whose negatives were discovered 39 years later in the federal German archives by a Greek journalist.

== Background ==
=== Geography ===
The village of Kondomari is part of the Platanias municipality and is located near the north coast of Crete, 18 kilometres (11 miles) west of the city of Chania and three kilometres (two miles) southeast of the Maleme airstrip.

=== During the Battle of Crete ===
The Battle of Crete began on 20 May 1941 with a large-scale airborne invasion aimed to capture the island's strategic locations. As was proven in practice, one of the most important locations was the Maleme airstrip and its surrounding region. Its capture allowed the Luftwaffe to fly in large-scale reinforcements of troops and supplies that eventually determined the outcome of the battle.

In the morning of 20 May 1941, German paratroopers of the III Battalion of the 1st Air Landing Assault Regiment were dropped southeast of Maleme. Their landing site extended to Platanias and included Kondomari. The invaders were confronted by New Zealand troops from the 21st and 22nd Battalions, joined by ill-armed local civilians carrying primitive weapons. The paratroopers experienced strong resistance and suffered severe losses that totaled nearly 400 men out of 600, including their commander Major Otto Scherber. Eugen Meindl, the regiment's commander, was shot through the chest during his parachute jump near the Platanias bridge but survived. He was replaced by Oberst Hermann-Bernhard Ramcke.

=== Student's order on reprisals ===
Throughout the Battle of Crete, the Allied forces and Cretan irregulars had inflicted heavy loss of life on the Wehrmacht. The unprecedented resistance from the local population exasperated the Prussian-influenced sense of military order (broadly consistent with older international law although most strictly held by Germany in both world wars) according to which only identifiable, uniformed soldiers under normal chain of command were allowed to fight and irregulars were not lawful combatants. Paratrooper units carried out impromptu executions before the end of the battle, e.g. at Missiria. Reports from General Julius Ringel, commander of the 5th Mountain Division, stated that Cretan civilians were picking off paratroopers or attacking them with knives, axes and scythes. Even before the end of the battle, exaggerated stories had started to circulate, attributing the excessively high casualties to torture and mutilation of paratroopers by the Cretans. When these stories reached the Luftwaffe's High Command in Berlin, Göring ordered temporary commander General Kurt Student to undertake enquiries and reprisals. Thus, seeking to counter insurgency and before enquiries were complete, Student issued an order to launch a wave of reprisals against the local population immediately after the surrender of Crete on 31 May. The reprisals were to be carried out rapidly, omitting formalities or trials and by the same units who had been confronted by the locals.

== The massacre ==
Following Student's order, the occupants of Kondomari were blamed for the death of a few German soldiers whose bodies had been found near the village. On 2 June 1941, four lorries full of German paratroopers from the III Battalion of Luftlande-Sturm-Regiment 1 under the command of Oberleutnant Horst Trebes surrounded Kondomari. Trebes, a former member of the Hitler Youth, was the highest-ranking officer of the Battalion to have survived the Battle unwounded. Men, women and children were forced to gather in the village square. Then, a number of hostages were selected among the men while women and children were released. The hostages were led to the surrounding olive groves and later fired upon. The exact number of the victims is unclear. According to German records, a total of 23 men were killed but other sources put the total at about 60. The whole operation was captured on film by Franz-Peter Weixler, then serving as a war propaganda correspondent (Kriegsberichterstatter) for the Wehrmacht.

=== Photos ===
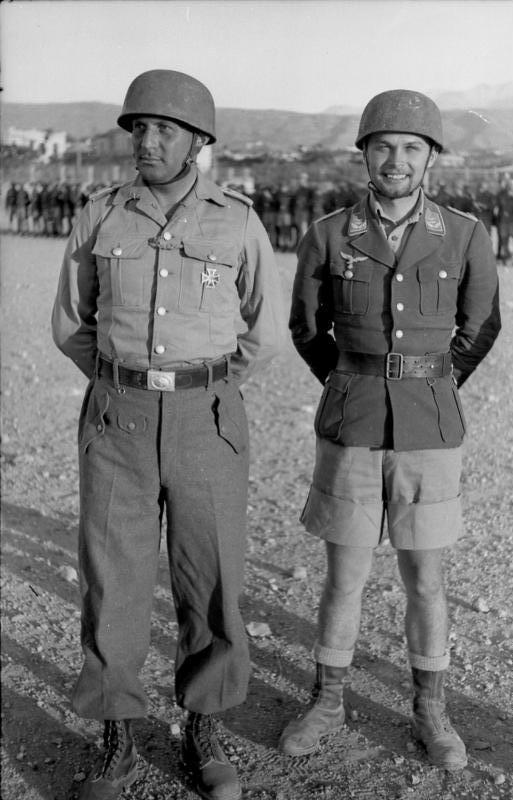
Walter Gericke (left); Horst Trebes (right)

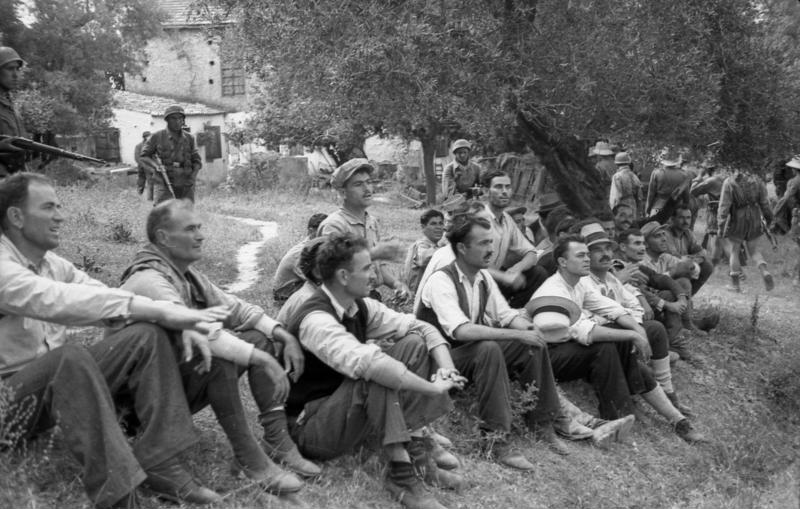
The civilian hostages at Kondomari

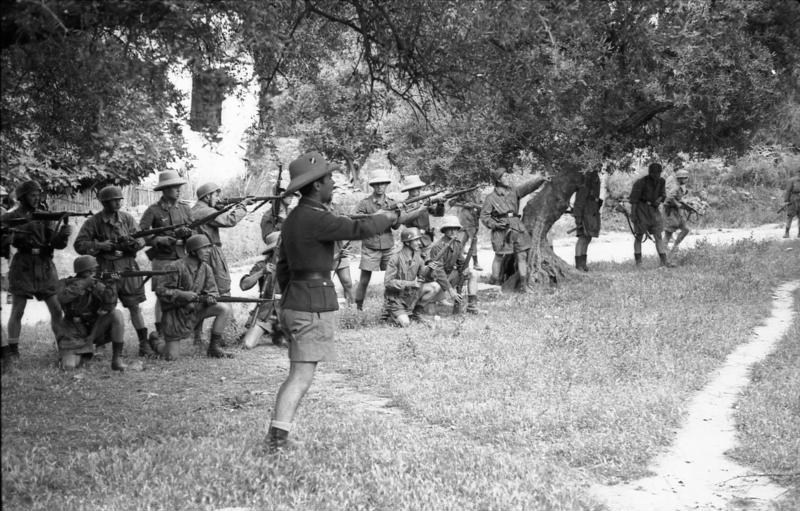
Paratroopers preparing to open fire; Horst Trebes in front

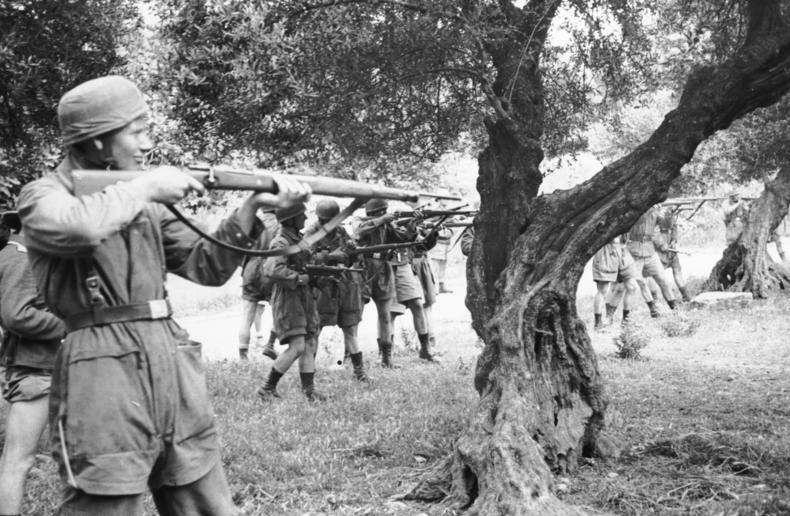
Firing squad soldier closeup

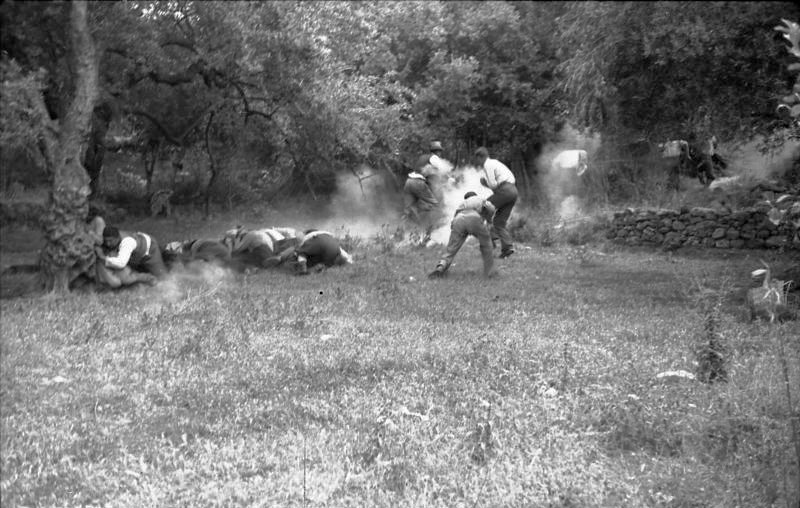
Civilians being shot

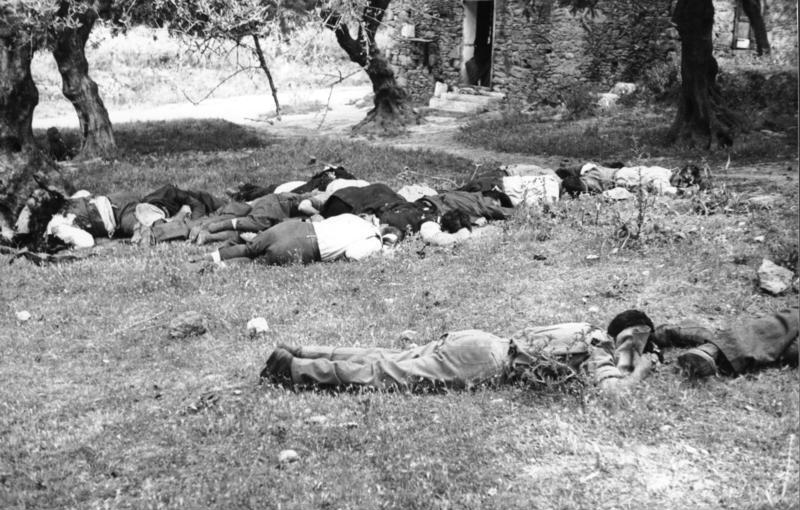
Dead bodies

== Aftermath ==
The day following the massacre of Kondomari, forces of the 1st Air Landing Assault Regiment went on to raze Kandanos and murder most of its people.

After the summer of 1941, Franz-Peter Weixler was dismissed from the Wehrmacht for political reasons. He was later accused of high treason against Nazi Germany for having leaked uncensored material related to the paratroopers' activities on Crete that included photographs taken in Kondomari, and for having helped some Cretans to flee. Weixler was arrested by the Gestapo, court martialled and imprisoned from early 1944. Post-war in November 1945, during Göring's trial in Nuremberg, Weixler gave a written eyewitness report on the Kondomari massacre. According to a documentary of the Greek TV network NET, he returned to Kondomari in 1955 where he was received by the villagers according to their traditional custom of hospitality. Realizing that there was no apparent hostility towards him, Weixler told them that he had been following orders on the day of the massacre. However, despite their apparent calmness, the villagers were tense and at some point, one of the survivors stood up and told his fellow villagers that the formal requirements of hospitality had been observed and they should leave. Thus, the assembled villagers immediately left the spot, leaving the photographer on his own.

Weixler's negatives from Kondomari were discovered in 1980 in the federal German archives by the Greek journalist Vassos Mathiopoulos, who was unaware of the actual location of the shootings they depicted. Their connection to the events at Kondomari was later established via extensive research by journalist Kostas Papapetrou, after which Weixler's photographs became widely known.

In July 1941, Horst Trebes was awarded the Knight's Cross for his leadership during the assault against Crete. Three years later (1944), he was killed in action in Normandy.

After the surrender of Germany, Kurt Student was captured by the British. In May 1947, he came before a military tribunal to answer charges of mistreatment and murder of prisoners of war and civilians by his forces in Crete. Greece's demand to have Student extradited was declined. Student was found guilty of three out of eight charges and sentenced to five years in prison. However, he was given a medical discharge and was released in 1948. Student was acquitted for crimes against civilians owing to the testimony of Brigadier Lindsay Inglis, commander of the 4th New Zealand Brigade. Student lived until 1978.

Kondomari has been declared a martyred village with Presidential Decree 29, ΦΕΚ Α 54/2.4.2019. A memorial in the village lists the names of the victims and has a wall of tiles portraying the incident.

== See also ==
- Missiria executions
- Razing of Kandanos
- Alikianos executions
- War crimes of the Wehrmacht
- List of massacres in Greece
