= Horst Trebes =

German paratrooper and Knight's Cross recipient (1916–1944)

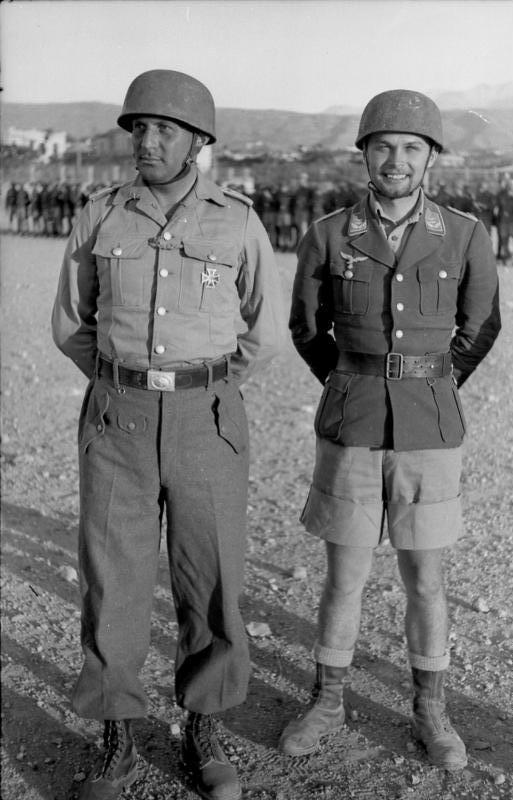
- Trebes (right) with Walter Gericke (left), 1941
- Born: 22 October 1916; Cologne, North Rhine-Westphalia, German Empire
- Died: 29 July 1944 (aged 27); Normandy, Occupied France
- Military career
- Allegiance: Nazi Germany
- Branch: Luftwaffe
- Rank: Major
- Unit: Fallschirmjäger
- Known for: Massacre of Kondomari and Kandanos massacre
- Conflicts: World War II; Invasion of Poland; Battle of Crete; Battle of Normandy †
- Awards: Knight's Cross of the Iron Cross

Horst Trebes (22 October 1916 – 29 July 1944) was a Hauptmann in the Fallschirmjäger of Nazi Germany during World War II. He was a recipient of the Knight's Cross of the Iron Cross. Trebes participated in the Massacre of Kondomari and the Kandanos massacre, both war crimes directed by Fallschirmjäger commander Kurt Student. He was killed in action in Normandy on 29 July 1944.

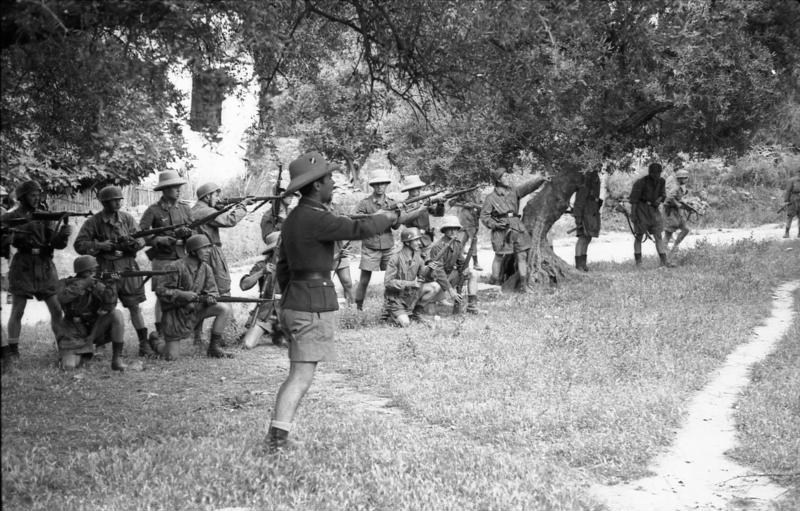
Trebes giving the command to open fire during the Massacre of Kondomari

== Awards ==
- Iron Cross (1939)
  - 2nd Class (13 October 1939)
  - 1st Class (23 May 1940)
- Knight's Cross of the Iron Cross on 9 July 1941 as Oberleutnant and leader of the III./Fallschirmjäger-Sturm-Regiment
