= Iardanus =

Iardanus or Iardanos (Ancient Greek: Ἰάρδανος, Greek: Ιάρδανος) may refer to:

- Iardanus (father of Omphale), a figure in Greek mythology.
- Iardanus (river in Crete), mentioned in the Odyssey, identified with the modern Keritis river.
- Iardanos (river in Elis), a river in Greece which flows into the Ionian Sea at the Monastery of Skafidia, north of Katakolo, mentioned in the Iliad.
- Iardanos, a former municipality in Greece, now part of the city of Pyrgos in Elis.
