= Weixler =

Weixler is a surname. Notable people with the surname include:

- Dorrit Weixler (1892–1916), German actress
- Franz-Peter Weixler (1899–1971), German photographer and war correspondent
- Jess Weixler (born 1981/1982), American actress

== See also ==
- Wexler (surname)
