= Floria, Greece =

Coordinates: 35°22′41.23″N 23°43′53.36″E

Floria (Greek: Φλώρια) is a small village in southwest Crete, Greece. Floria is part of the Kantanos-Selino municipality and, according to the latest census, has around 60 inhabitants.

On 23 May 1941 and while the Battle of Crete was unfolding, Floria was the location of a fierce battle between advancing German troops and the local population, who spontaneously decided to resist them. In reprisal, a few days later German forces executed several of the villagers during an operation that resulted in the razing of Kandanos.

Floria is also a name for a girl such as Florence or Florida.

== See also ==
- Kandanos
- Razing of Kandanos
