= 21st Parachute Division =

German WWII airborne division

- German: 21. Fallschirmjäger-Division
- Active: 1945
- Country: Germany
- Branch: Luftwaffe
- Type: Fallschirmjäger
- Size: Division

Commanders
- Notable commanders: Walter Gericke

The 21st Parachute Division (German: 21. Fallschirmjäger-Division) was a division of the German military during World War II, active in 1945.

== History ==
The division was formed in March 1945 in the Netherlands, using elements of Sturm-Brigade Gericke and troops from the disbanded Fallschirmjäger Ausbildungs-und-Ersatz-Division.

The division did not manage to form fully before the end of the war, and did not see combat.
