= 27th Machine-Gun Battalion (New Zealand) =

27th Machine Gun Battalion
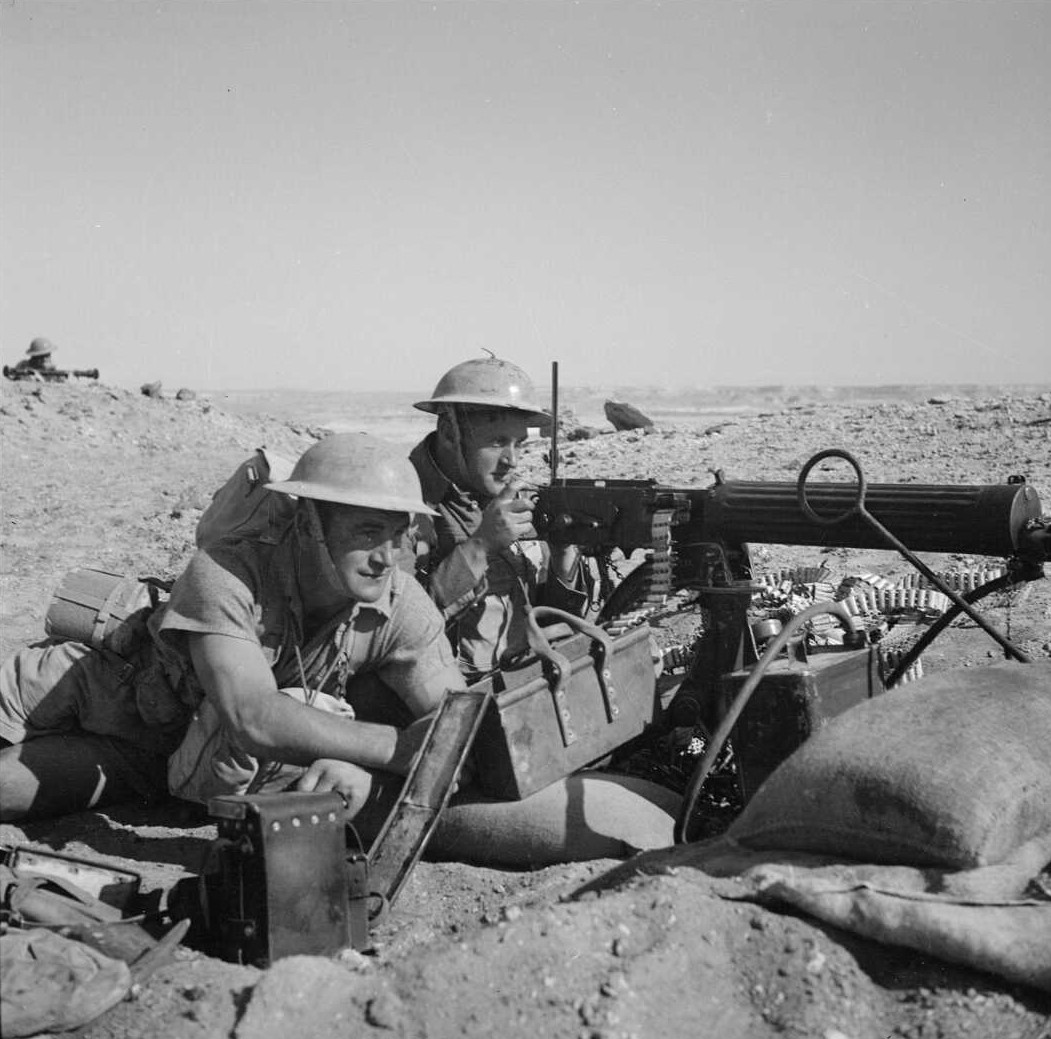
- Machine gun team of 27th Battalion, Egypt 1941
- Active: 1939–1948
- Country: New Zealand
- Branch: New Zealand Military Forces
- Type: Infantry
- Role: Sustained fire support
- Size: ~ 700 personnel
- Part of: 2nd New Zealand Division
- Equipment: Vickers machine gun
- Engagements: Second World War: Greek Campaign; Western Desert Campaign; Tunisian Campaign; Occupation of Japan

Commanders
- Notable commanders: Lindsay Merritt Inglis

The 27th Machine-Gun Battalion was a unit of the 2nd New Zealand Division during the Second World War. It served in the Greek Campaign, Western Desert Campaign, Tunisian Campaign, Italian Campaign and after the war took part in the Occupation of Japan. It was one of two New Zealand formations that served overseas longer than any other unit in the New Zealand Expeditionary Force. The battalion was also one of the New Zealand units that supplied men for the Long Range Desert Group.

== History ==
=== Formation ===
The 27th Machine-Gun Battalion was raised at Burnham, New Zealand, on 3 October 1939. With an authorised strength of around 700 personnel and equipped with Vickers machine guns, the battalion consisted of four machine gun companies, designated No. 1 to No. 4, underneath a headquarters company which fulfilled various specialist functions including administration, signals, transport, and anti-aircraft defence. Under the command of Lieutenant Colonel Lindsay Merritt Inglis, the battalion undertook training in New Zealand before being shipped to Egypt in January 1941.

=== Mediterranean theatre ===
Further training was undertaken at Maadi Camp, after which the 27th was one of the first units of the 2nd New Zealand Division to go into action in the Greek Campaign in April 1941. It took part in all the battles during the 300-mile (480 km) withdrawal to the Peloponnese, including the rearguard actions in the Battle of Vevi and the Battle of Mount Olympus. The battalion, together with the rest of the division, was withdrawn to the island Crete and took part in the subsequent Battle of Crete during the German invasion, fighting at Maleme and Galatas.

After Crete, the battalion served in the Western Desert Campaign, in Operation Crusader in 1941 and the Second Battle of El Alamein, and the pursuit of the Axis forces to Tunisia where it took part in the Tunisian Campaign. Notable was the flanking manoeuvre around the Mareth Line. The battalion was also one of the New Zealand units that supplied men for the Long Range Desert Group.

The battalion was next in action during the Italian Campaign during which its Vickers machine guns fired nearly nine million rounds of ammunition. It was one of the first New Zealand units to cross the Sangro River and early in 1945, was converted to an infantry battalion and fought in the crossing of the Sillaro River and at the Gaiana Canal, ending the war with the capture of Trieste. The battalion's casualties during the war amounted to 182 killed, 508 wounded and 257 captured. Members of the battalion received the following decorations: three Distinguished Service Orders, eight Military Crosses and one Bar, and 26 Military Medals. One officer was also appointed to the Order of the British Empire.

=== Postwar ===
In the post war period, the battalion was then transferred to the Far East, where it was converted to an infantry unit and served with the New Zealand occupation forces in Japan. On 7 August 1947, the 27th Battalion changed its name to 3rd Battalion, New Zealand Regiment. It was disbanded in 1948 following its return to New Zealand.

== Battle honours ==
For their service, in 1957 the 27th Machine-Gun Battalion received 34 battle honours:

- Veve
- Greece 1941
- Crete
- Galatas
- Middle East 1941–44
- Tobruk 1941
- Sidi Azeiz
- Mersa Matruh
- Minqar Qaim
- Defence of Alamein Line
- El Mreir
- Alam el Halfa
- El Alamein
- Tebaga Gap
- El Hamma
- Enfidaville
- Takrouna
- North Africa 1940–43
- The Sangro
- Castel Frentano
- Orsogna
- Cassino I
- Advance to Florence
- Cerbia
- San Michele
- Paula Line
- Celle
- Faenza Pocket
- St Angelo in Salute
- Pisciatello
- Bologna
- Sillaro Crossing
- Gaiana Crossing
- Italy 1943–45

== Commanding officers ==
The following officers commanded the 27th Machine-Gun Battalion:

- Lieutenant Colonel L. M. Inglis (1939–1940)
- Lieutenant Colonel F. J. Gwilliam (1940–1942)
- Lieutenant Colonel J. K. Robbie (1942)
- Lieutenant Colonel A. W. White (1942–1943)
- Lieutenant Colonel R. L. McGaffin (1943)
- Lieutenant Colonel J. K. Robbie (1943)
- Lieutenant Colonel J. L. MacDuff (1943–1944)
- Lieutenant Colonel R. L. Hutchens (1944)
- Lieutenant Colonel D. G. Steele (1944)
- Lieutenant Colonel G. P. Sanders (1944–1946)
- Lieutenant Colonel W. F. Titchener (1946–1947)
- Lieutenant Colonel R. C. Hollis (1947)
- Lieutenant Colonel R. B. Dawson (1947)
