= Kurt Student =

German general (1890–1978)

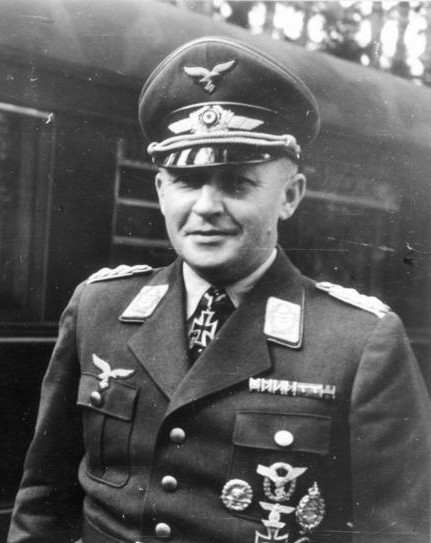
- Student in 1941
- Born: 12 May 1890; Birkholz, German Empire (now Borów, Poland)
- Died: 1 July 1978 (aged 88); Lemgo, West Germany
- Military career
- Allegiance: German Empire; Weimar Republic; Nazi Germany
- Branch: Imperial German Army; Prussian Army; Reichswehr; Luftwaffe
- Service years: 1910–1945
- Rank: Generaloberst
- Commands: 7th Air Division; 11th Air Corps; 1st Parachute Army
- Conflicts: World War I World War II
- Awards: Knight's Cross of the Iron Cross with Oak Leaves
- Criminal information
- Status: Released in 1948
- Criminal charge: War crimes
- Penalty: 5 years imprisonment

Details
- Victims: Cretan civilians Allied prisoners of war
- Date: May 1941
- Country: Greece
- Location: Crete

Kurt Arthur Benno Student (12 May 1890 – 1 July 1978) was a German general in the Luftwaffe during World War II. An early pioneer of airborne forces, Student was in overall command of developing a paratrooper force to be known as the Fallschirmjäger, and as the most senior member of the Fallschirmjäger, commanded it throughout the war. Student led the first major airborne attack in history, the Battle for The Hague, in May 1940. He also commanded the Fallschirmjäger in its last major airborne operation, the invasion of Crete in May 1941. The operation was a success despite German losses, and led the Allies to hasten the training and development of their own airborne units.

In 1947, Student was tried and convicted of war crimes for the mistreatment and murder of prisoners of war by his men in Crete. Student was also responsible for a wave of reprisal massacres committed against Cretan civilians in 1941 but avoided harsh punishment.

== Early life and career ==
Student entered the Prussian Army as a Fähnrich in 1910 and was commissioned a lieutenant in March 1911. He qualified as a pilot in 1913 and served during World War I.

=== World War I ===
In July 1916, Student became a charter member of the Fokker Scourge, when he scored his first confirmed victory, forcing Nieuport 11 no. 1324 to land behind German lines. He then served in aerial units of the Third Army on the Western Front, including Jagdstaffel 9 (Jasta 9), which he commanded from 5 October 1916 to 2 May 1917, when he was wounded. He achieved flying ace status and scored six air-to-air victories over French aircraft between 1916 and 1917, with two coming after his wound. He left Jasta 9 on 14 March 1918.

=== Interwar period ===
In the immediate postwar years, Student was assigned to military research and development. He became involved in military gliders since gliding was not forbidden by the Treaty of Versailles. He also attended the Red Army Air Force's maneuvers in Lipetsk fighter-pilot school and first came in contact with the idea of airborne operations. After Adolf Hitler came to power in Germany, the Luftwaffe was secretly re-established. Student transferred from the Army to the Air Force and was appointed by Hermann Göring to be the head of its training schools. In July 1938, he was named commander of airborne and air-landing troops and, in September, commanding general of the 7th Air Division, Germany's first paratroop division.

== World War II ==
After the invasion of Poland in September 1939, which marked the beginning of the Second World War in Europe, the Fallschirmjäger were first deployed during the invasions of Norway and Denmark in Operation Weserübung in April 1940. In this operation, the Fallschirmjäger were deployed on several locations. In Denmark, a small unit dropped on Masnedø island to seize the Storstrøm Bridge linking Falster and Zealand. A paratroop detachment also dropped at Aalborg Airfield, which was crucial for Luftwaffe operations over Norway. In Norway, a company of paratroopers dropped at Oslo's undefended airstrip. Over the course of the morning and early afternoon of April 9, 1940, the Germans flew in sufficient reinforcements to seize the capital, but by that time the Norwegian government had fled.

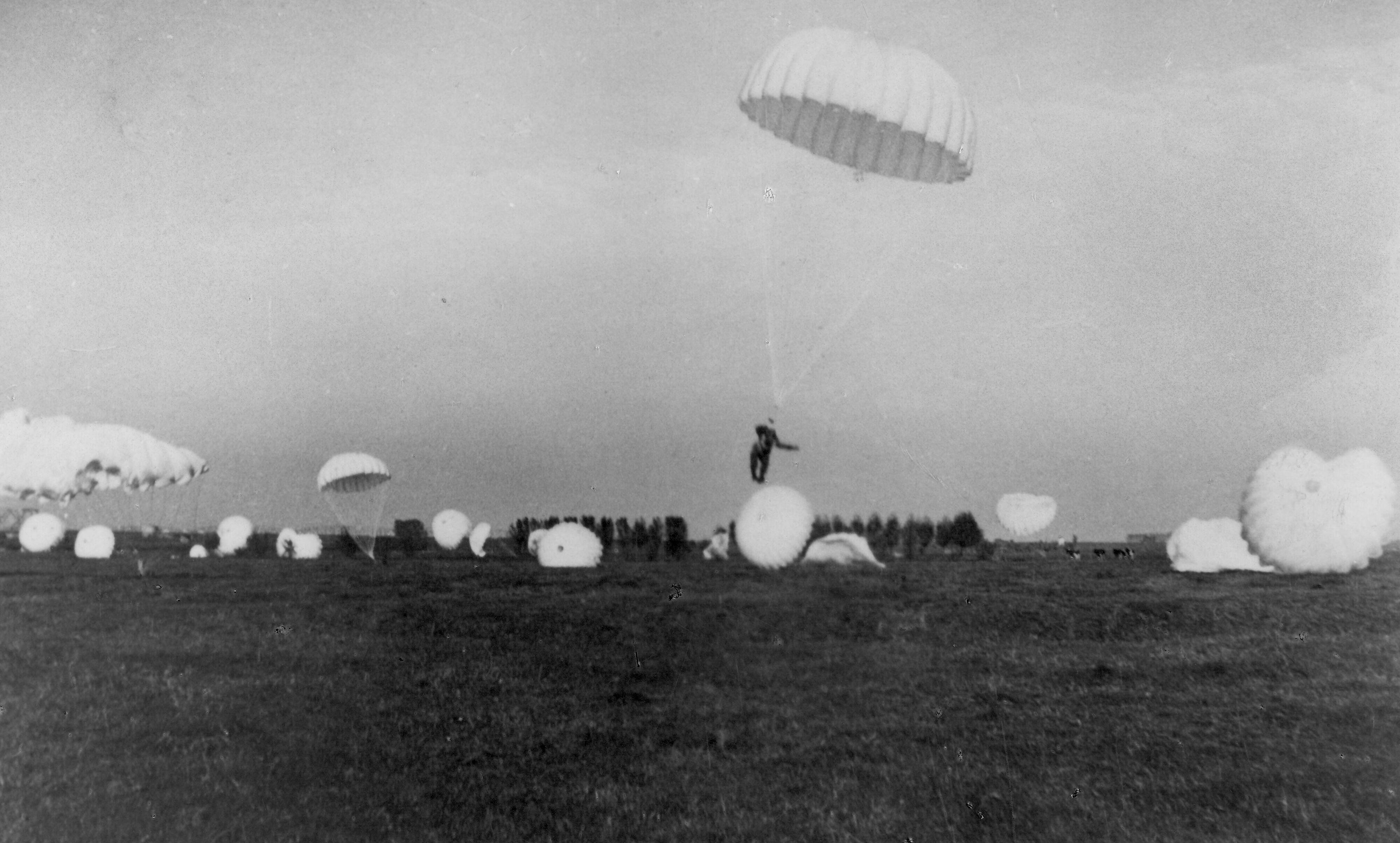
German paratroopers landing at the Ockenburg airfield near The Hague, 10 May 1940

The paratroopers' first major action (and the first large-scale airborne operation in history) was the battle for The Hague on 10 May 1940. German paratroopers landed at three airfields near The Hague. From one of these airfields, they were driven out after the first wave of reinforcements, brought in by Ju 52s, was annihilated by anti-aircraft fire and fierce resistance by some remaining Dutch defenders. The other two airfields were recaptured as well. Simultaneously, small packets of paratroopers seized the crucial bridges that led directly across the Netherlands and into the heart of the country. They opened the way for the 9th Panzer Division. Within a day, the Dutch position became indefensible. Nevertheless, Dutch forces inflicted high losses on German transportation aircraft. Moreover, 1200 German élite troops from the Luftlandekorps, taken prisoner around The Hague, were shipped to England just before the capitulation of the Dutch armed forces.

During airborne operations in the Battle of Rotterdam of 10 to 14 May 1940, Student was almost taken prisoner, and was shot in the head – by what was later determined to be a stray German round. His capture was halted by the bombing of Rotterdam on 14 May and by the subsequent capitulation of the Netherlands.

On 10 May 1940, the Fallschirmjäger performed a successful raid on the largest fort in the world at the time, Eben-Emael, manned by 1,200 Belgian troops. The raid was accomplished by an assault group which consisted of only 85 soldiers. It took the Fallschirmjäger only hours to take control of the fort. The fall of Eben-Emael opened up Belgium for invasion by Army Group B. For his role in the raid, Student was decorated with the Knight's Cross of the Iron Cross.

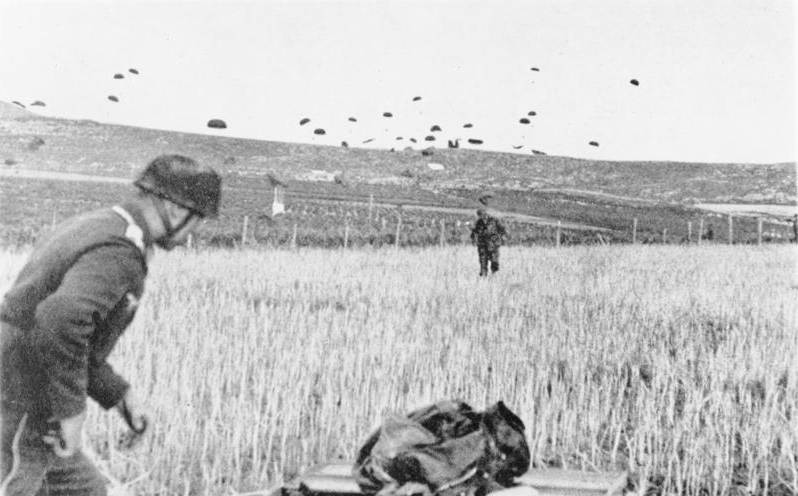
German paratroopers landing on Crete, May 1941

In January 1941, Student was named commanding general of the XI. Fliegerkorps, the newly formed command for the expanding German airborne forces. He was ordered to prepare a plan to use airborne forces for the capture of Gibraltar. In May 1941, Student directed Operation Mercury (Unternehmen Merkur), the airborne invasion of Crete, which was defended by British, Greek and Commonwealth forces. Crete was taken, in what became the greatest victory of the Fallschirmjäger, but the high casualties caused Hitler to forbid future major airborne operations.

During the invasion of Crete, the German forces encountered unexpected mass resistance from the civilian population and several German parachutists were killed by civilians armed only with knives and clubs. The German troops were initially surprised and later outraged. German military intelligence, the Abwehr, had predicted that the Cretan population would welcome the Germans as liberators, due to Cretans' strong republican and anti-monarchist feelings and that they would want to receive the "... favourable terms which had been arranged on the mainland ...". Student was made the temporary commander of Crete immediately after the island's surrender on 31 May 1941. On Hermann Göring's orders, Student launched a wave of brutal reprisals against the local population with the massacre of Kondomari, the Alikianos executions, and the razing of Kandanos being well-known examples.

In 1943, Student ordered Major Harald Mors to plan Operation Oak (Unternehmen Eiche), the successful raid conducted by a special Fallschirmjäger unit to free Italian dictator Benito Mussolini. They landed with gliders and STOL aircraft on a hilltop. Student received the Oak Leaves to the Knight's Cross of the Iron Cross for his role in this operation.

Student was transferred to Italy and later to France, where he was involved in the battles of Normandy in 1944. He was put in charge of the First Paratroop Army and took part in countering the Allied Operation Market Garden, near Arnhem. After a brief time at the Eastern Front in Mecklenburg in 1945, he was captured by British forces in Schleswig-Holstein in April of that same year before he could take command of Army Group Vistula.

== War crimes conviction ==
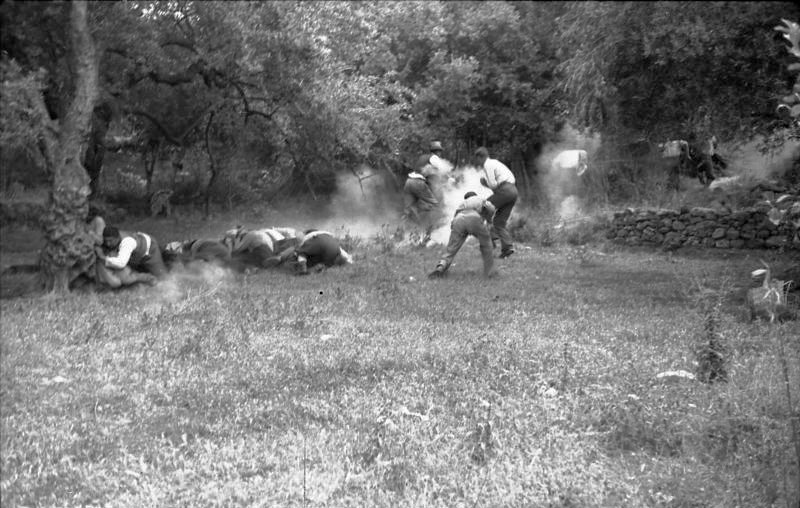
Up to 60 Cretan civilians were massacred at Kondomari by Student's Fallschirmjäger in June 1941

In May 1947, Student was put on trial on eight charges of mistreatment and murder of prisoners of war by his men in Crete, and crimes against the civilian population of Crete, like those at Kondomari, Alikianos and Kandanos. He was found guilty of three charges relating to prisoners of war, but acquitted of crimes against civilians owing to the testimony of Brigadier Lindsay Inglis, commander of the 4th New Zealand Brigade. Student was sentenced to five years of imprisonment but was given an early discharge in 1948 for medical reasons. He died in 1978, the last surviving Luftwaffe Generaloberst.

== Promotions ==
- 1910: Fähnrich
- 1911: Leutnant
- 1915: Oberleutnant
- 1918: Hauptmann
- 1930: Major
- 1934: Oberstleutnant
- 1935: Oberst
- 1938: Generalmajor
- 1940: Generalleutnant
- 1940: General der Fallschirmtruppe
- 1944: Generaloberst

== Awards ==
- Iron Cross (1914)
  - 2nd Class (26 September 1914)
  - 1st Class (29 August 1915)
- Clasp to the Iron Cross (1939)
  - 2nd Class (20 September 1939)
  - 1st Class (20 September 1939)
- Knight's Cross of the Iron Cross with Oak Leaves
  - Knight's Cross on 12 May 1940 as Generalleutnant and commander of the 7. Flieger-Division (Fallschirmjäger).
  - 305th Oak Leaves on 27 September 1943 as General der Flieger and commander of XI. Flieger-Korps (Luft-lande-Korps)
- Pilot/Observer Badge in Gold with Diamonds (2 September 1941)

Military offices
Preceded by New unit	Commander of 7. Flieger-Division; 1 September 1938 – 16 May 1940	Succeeded by Generalleutnant Richard Putzier
Preceded by New unit	Commander of XI. Fliegerkorps; 19 December 1940 – 3 April 1944	Redesignated 1. Fallschirmarmee
Redesignated from XI. Fliegerkorps	Commander of 1. Fallschirmarmee; 4 September 1944 – 18 November 1944	Succeeded by General der Fallschirmtruppen Alfred Schlemm
Preceded by New unit	Commander of Army Group H 11 November 1944 – 28 January 1945	Succeeded by Generaloberst Johannes Blaskowitz
Preceded by General der Infanterie Günther Blumentritt	Commander of 1. Fallschirmarmee; 10 April 1945 – 28 April 1945	Succeeded by General der Infanterie Erich Straube
