= 11th Parachute Division =

- German: 11. Fallschirmjäger-Division
- Active: March 1945–May 1945
- Country: Germany
- Branch: Luftwaffe
- Type: Fallschirmjäger
- Size: Division
- Engagements: World War II

The 11th Parachute Division (German: 11. Fallschirmjäger-Division) was an infantry division of the German military during the Second World War, active in 1945.

The division was formed in March 1945 near Linz, out of a disparate collection of Luftwaffe units including aircrew from Jagdgeschwader 101. It contained the 37th, 38th and 39th Fallschirmjäger Regiments, and the 11th Fallschirmjäger Artillery Regiment.

The division did not manage to form fully before the end of the war, and only isolated kampfgruppen saw combat.
