= Kandanos massacre =

1941 massacre and destruction of the Cretan village of Kondanos by Nazi troops

Coordinates: 35.3274°N 23.7409°E

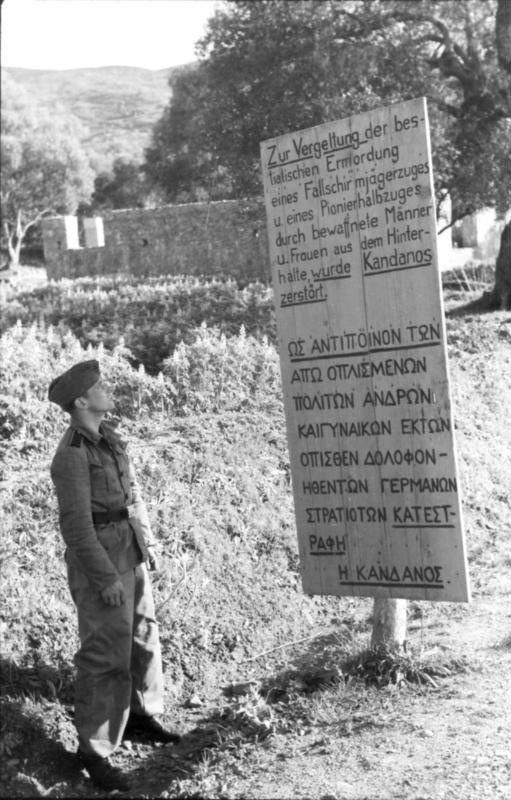
A German soldier in front of one of the signs erected after the razing. The text reads: "Kandanos was destroyed in retaliation for the bestial ambush murder of a paratrooper platoon and a half-platoon of military engineers by armed men and women."

The village of Kandanos in Western Crete, Greece, was completely destroyed and about 180 of its inhabitants killed on 3 June 1941 by German occupying forces during World War II. It was ordered by Generaloberst Kurt Student in reprisal for the participation of the local population in the Battle of Crete that had held advancing German soldiers for two days. The destruction constituted one of the most atrocious war crimes committed during the occupation of Crete by Axis forces in World War II.

== Background ==
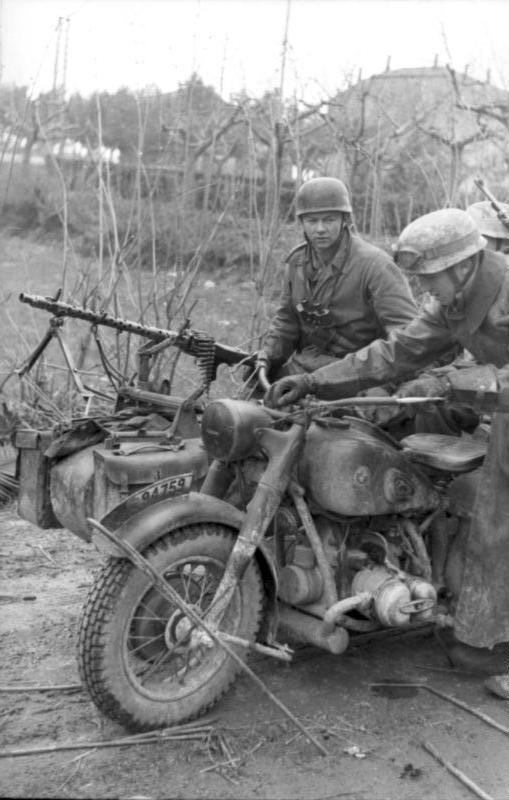
BMW R75 with sidecar and MG34.

=== Local resistance ===
The Battle of Crete began on 20 May 1941 with a large-scale airborne invasion planned to capture the island's strategic locations. Kandanos is located on the road from Chania on the north coast to Paleochora in the south, which was a candidate landing point for potential Allied reinforcements from North Africa. The village of Kandanos had been bombed during the first days of the attack and a small motorized German detachment (riding motorcycles with MG 34 machine guns on their sidecars) attempted to move through it on 23 May 1941, aiming to reach and secure Paleochora.

On the following day, local civilians from Kandanos, Paleochora and nearby smaller villages gathered in larger numbers. With the assistance of a few Selino gendarmes, they set an ambush for the advancing German troops of the 5th Gebirgsdivision (elements of the 55 motorcycle Battalion and the 95 anti-tank Battalion), at Kandanos' gorge.

Despite their strong resistance on 24 and 25 May and their limited casualties, the locals were vastly outnumbered and were thus eventually forced to retreat into the mountains, letting the Germans advance towards Paleochora.

=== Repercussions ===
During the Battle of Crete, the invading German forces had suffered heavy losses. The rapid development of guerilla resistance was unprecedented in Nazi-occupied Europe. Particularly shocking to the invaders were woman, child, or elderly combatants.

According to Antony Beevor, "In the speed, uncertainty and fear of battle, neither side showed much regard for the Geneva Convention." The corpses of a group of Germans sent to capture Kastelli Kissamou were desecrated by local civilians, and Göring and Goebbels began to spread the rumor that they had been tortured while still alive. Soon, the German conventional wisdom held Cretan violations of the law of war as responsible for the high parachutist casualty rate.

German military doctrine held a particularly dim view of nonprofessional combatants. Immediately after the surrender of Crete on 31 May, temporary commander General Kurt Student sought to set an example. He ordered a wave of brutal reprisals against the local population, which "must, however, be taken rapidly and omitting all formalities." These were carried out by the same units who had confronted the locals in battle a few days before.

== The razing ==
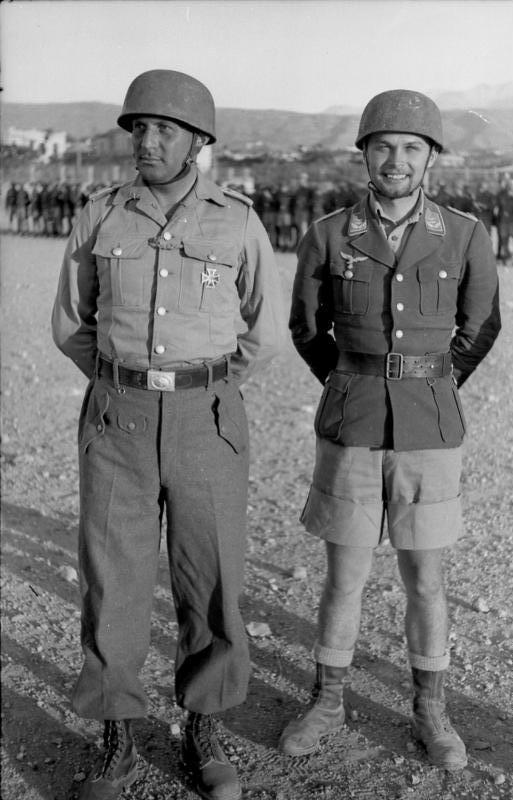
Horst Trebes (right) with Walter Gericke in July 1941.

On 3 June 1941, a day after executing several civilians in Kondomari, German troops from the III Battalion of the 1st Air Landing Assault Regiment (most probably led by Oberleutnant Horst Trebes) reached Kandanos, following Student's order for reprisals. The Germans killed about 180 residents and slaughtered all livestock; all houses were torched and razed.

Nearby villages such as Floria and Kakopetro met a similar fate. After its destruction, Kandanos was declared a 'dead zone' and its remaining population was forbidden to return to the village and rebuild it. Finally, inscriptions in German and Greek were erected on each entry of the village. One read: Here stood Kandanos, destroyed in retribution for the murder of 25 German soldiers, never to be rebuilt again.

== Aftermath ==
A memorial to the fallen soldiers of the 95 Battalion was erected by the 5. Gebirgs Division near Floria after the surrender of Crete.

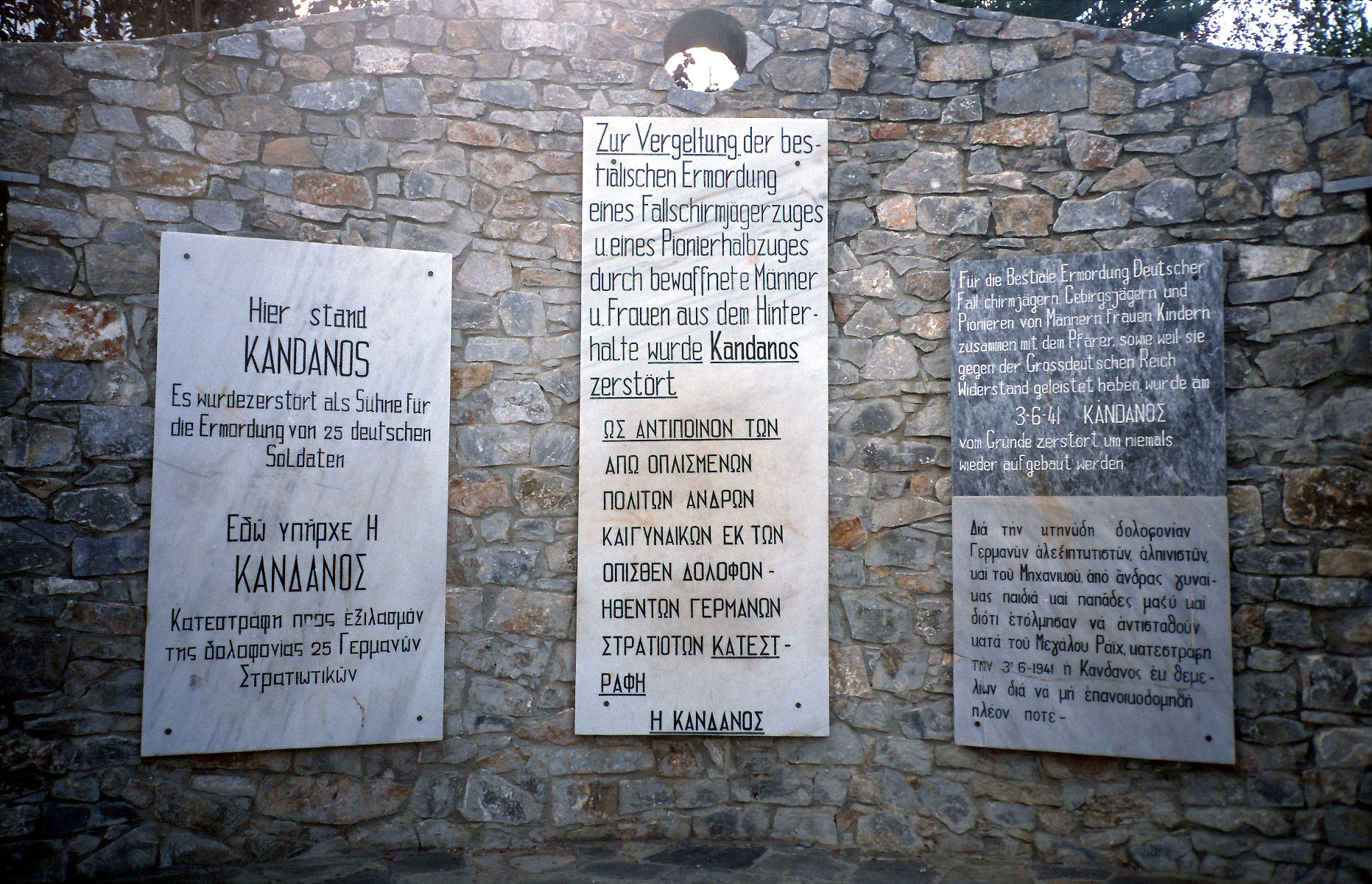
The Kandanos war memorial in 2000

After the surrender of Germany, General Kurt Student was captured by the British. In May 1947, he came before a military tribunal to answer charges of mistreatment and murder of prisoners of war and civilians by his forces in Crete. Greece's demand to have Student extradited was declined by the British because they chose to try him themselves. Student was found guilty of three out of eight charges and sentenced to five years in prison. However, he was given a medical discharge and was released in 1948. Student was acquitted for crimes against civilians, partially due to testimony given by Maj Gen Lindsay Inglis at his trial.

Today, Kandanos has been rebuilt and is the seat of the eponymous municipality. Reproductions of the sombre Wehrmacht signposts commemorating the destruction of the village are displayed on a local war memorial.

On 31 October 2024, German President Frank-Walter Steinmeier visited Kandanos. He asked for forgiveness on behalf of Germany for the crimes committed by the Wehrmacht, saying "I ask you, the survivors and descendants, for your forgiveness for the heinous crimes perpetrated here by Germans. I ask for forgiveness for the fact that over many decades my country failed to punish these crimes."

== See also ==
- Viannos massacres
- Razing of Anogeia
- Oradour-sur-Glane massacre
- Lidice massacre
- War crimes of the Wehrmacht
