= Kondomari =

Kondomari Κοντομαρί
- Community
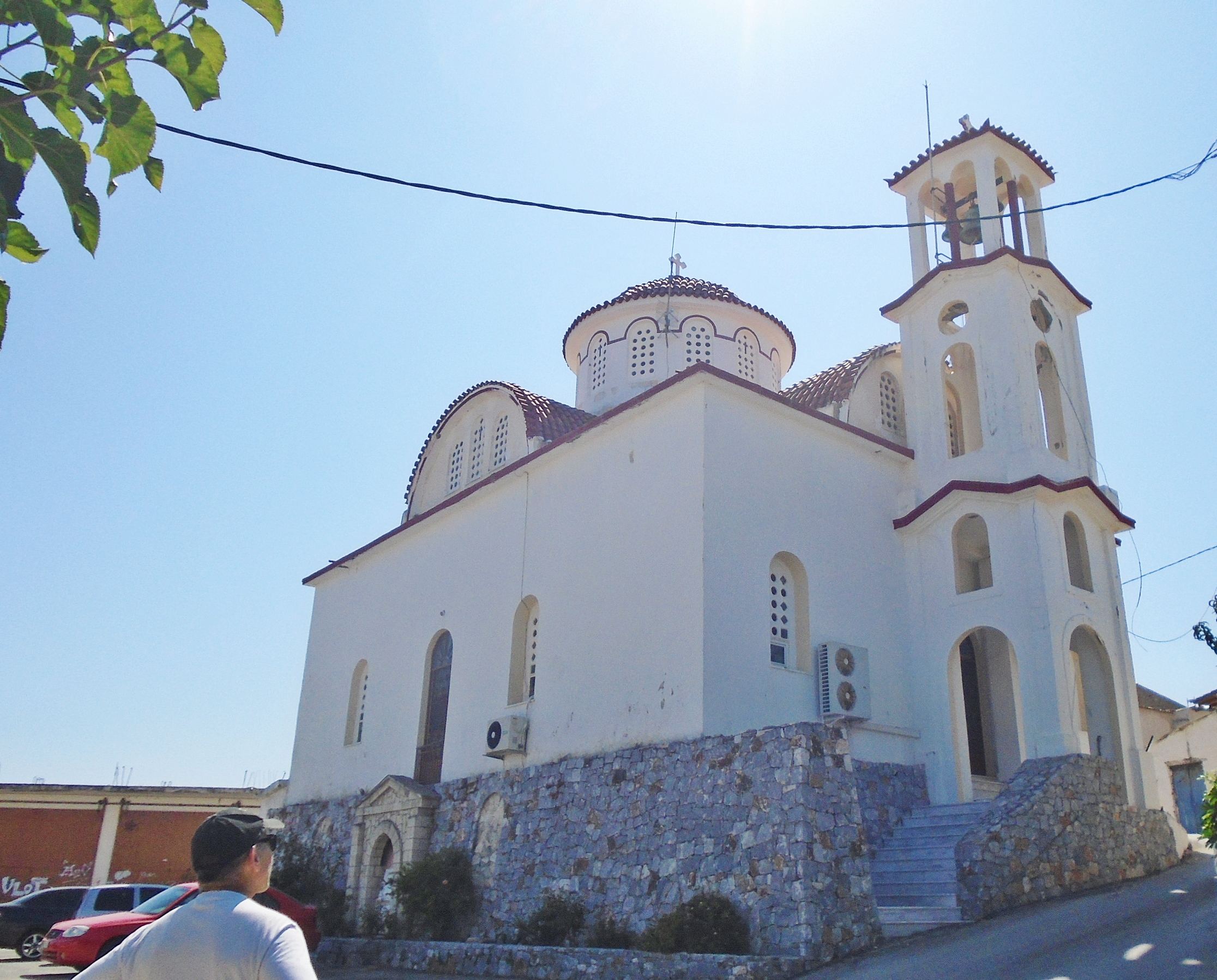
- Zoodochos Pigi church, Kondomari

- Location within Greece
- Coordinates: 35°30′N 23°51′E
- Country: Greece
- Administrative region: Crete
- Regional unit: Chania
- Municipality: Platanias
- Municipal unit: Platanias

Population (2021)
  - Community: 440
- Time zone: UTC+2 (EET)
  - Summer (DST): UTC+3 (EEST)

Kondomari or Kontomari (Greek: Κοντομαρί) is a Greek village, part of the municipality of Platanias in Crete. It is located near the northern coast of Crete, 18 km west of Chania and 3 km southeast of Maleme.

It is known for being the site of the Kondomari Massacre on 2 June 1941, when at least 23 civilians were executed by German paratroopers after the Battle of Crete as a reprisal for the deaths of several German soldiers. Kondomari has been declared a martyred village by presidential decree and a memorial in the village lists the names of the victims and has a wall of tiles portraying the incident.

== See also ==
- List of communities of Chania
