= Franz-Peter Weixler =

German photographer and war correspondent

Franz-Peter Weixler (31 August 1899 – 23 April 1971) was a German photographer and war correspondent. He was involved in photographing the shooting of hostages in Crete during the Second World War.

== Period of National Socialism ==
In 1933 Weixler became a member of the NSDAP and the SS. In 1934 he was excluded there for political reasons and participated in resistance groups, after which he was arrested. Special court proceedings against him were terminated due to an amnesty. In 1937 he also lost his position at a bank for political reasons, and worked as a freelance photographer and author from 1937 to 1939.

In 1939 Weixler joined the German Wehrmacht as a war correspondent and took part in the Balkan campaign in 1941 with the airborne battle over Crete. In addition to his normal camera, he also worked with a stereoscopic camera and sometimes used rare color films at that time. War reporters were given the task of providing the National Socialist-led Ministry of Propaganda with photos that only painted a positive, heroic picture of the German view of war as possible. Weixler did not necessarily stick to this approach.

On 2 June 1941, Weixler documented in a series of photographs the shooting of 23 unarmed Greek civilians by German paratroopers in retaliation for alleged Greek atrocities against German soldiers during the Battle of Crete. Taking such photos and, moreover, showing them uncensored to unauthorized persons was seen as a denigration of the armed forces, and was punishable by death under martial law at the time. Weixler was denounced and arrested in March 1944 on charges of treason and was sent to the Munich Prison in the suburb of Neudeck. After the relevant files were burned at Berlin during the war, the legal process was delayed until the end of the war and Weixler avoided being convicted.

The negatives of photos were discovered several decades later in the Federal German archives. According to Weixler's own testimony:

It was possible for me to get the negatives of my photos to a friend in Athens, who saved copies for me.

== Later life ==
In November 1945, Weixler gave a written testimony and his documentary photos of the executions of Kondomari to the Nuremberg War Crimes trial court. Weixler's testimony indicated that "we had never seen a single murder or massacre [of Wehrmacht troops]"., highlighting the fallacious nature of Nazi "reprisal action" justifications for war crimes committed in Greece. In his home town of Krailling, he was one of the founding members of the local Union CSU. He died on 23 April 1971, in Bad Reichenhall. The German Historical Museum in Berlin holds around a thousand photos by Weixler, which show the entire spectrum of his work.

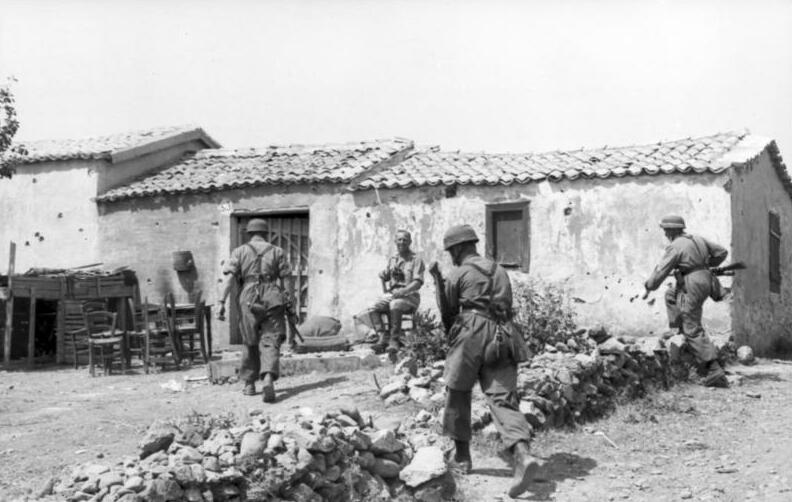

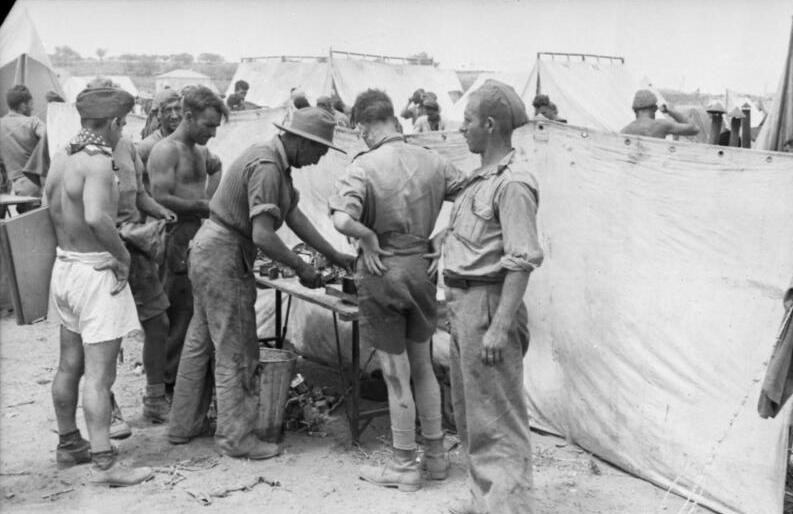

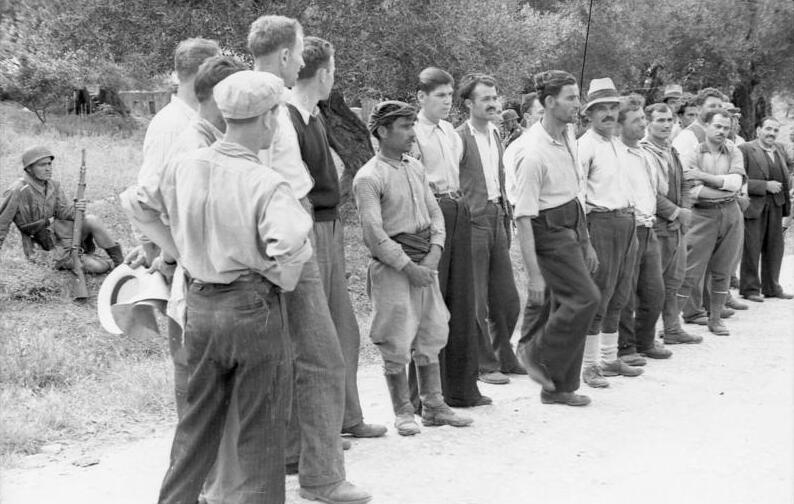

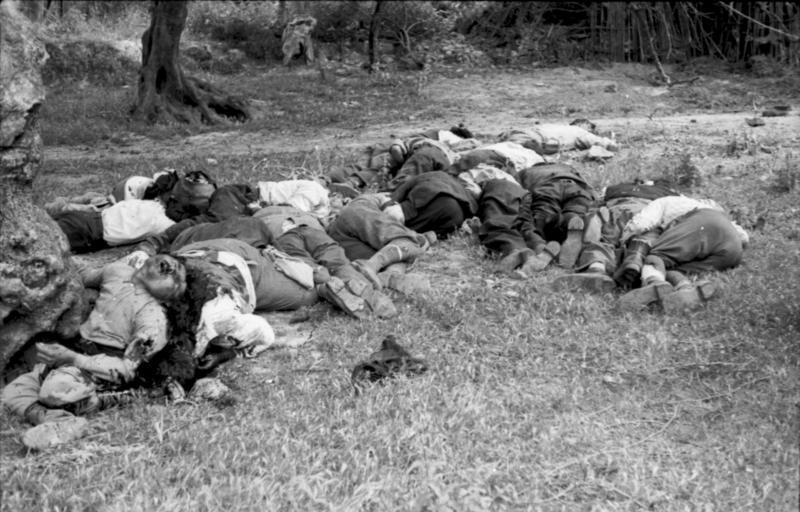

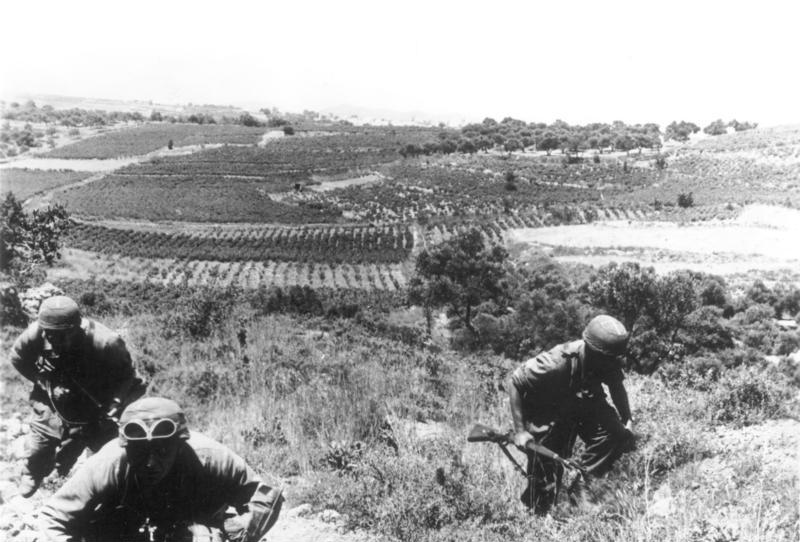

== Publications ==
- Weixler, Franz Peter (1950). Anno Santo 1950. Raumbild-Verlag Otto Schönstein - Klondyke (Almere, Netherlands).
- Neal, Stephan D. Yada-Mc (2018). Franz-Peter Weixler The invasion of Greece and Crete by the camera of a propaganda photographer: With 16 rare color photos. BoD – Books on Demand. ISBN 978-3-7460-0753-3.
- Neal, Stephan D. Yada-Mc (2019). Operation Merkury: The conquest of Crete and its consequences, seen through the camera of Franz-Peter Weixler. BoD – Books on Demand. p. 8. ISBN 978-3-7347-8374-6.

== See also ==
- Massacre of Kondomari
