= Walter Gericke =

German paratroop officer in the Luftwaffe of Nazi Germany

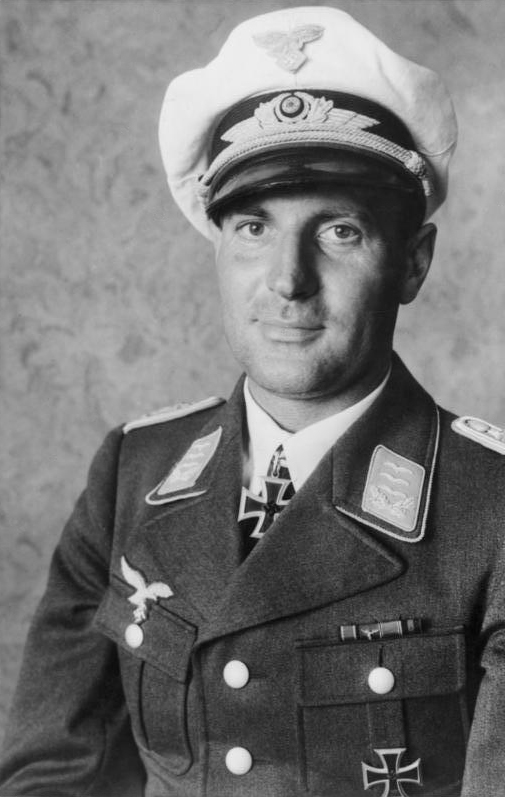
- Born: 23 December 1907; Bilderlahe, German Empire
- Died: 19 October 1991 (aged 83)
- Military career
- Allegiance: Weimar Republic; Nazi Germany; West Germany
- Branch: Luftwaffe (Wehrmacht); German Army (Bundeswehr)
- Service years: 1929–45, 1956–65
- Rank: Oberst (Wehrmacht); Generalmajor (Bundeswehr)
- Commands: 11th Parachute Division; 1. Luftlandedivision
- Conflicts: World War II
- Awards: Knight's Cross of the Iron Cross with Oak Leaves

Walter Gericke (23 December 1907 – 19 October 1991) was a German officer in the Luftwaffe of Nazi Germany during World War II and a general in the Bundeswehr of West Germany. He was a recipient of the Knight's Cross of the Iron Cross with Oak Leaves.

Gericke took part in the Battle of the Netherlands and the Battle of Crete as a Fallschirmjäger battalion commander. He later commanded the Fallschirmjäger-Regiment 11 (part of the 4. Fallschirmjäger-Division) and fought in the Battle of Anzio.

Gericke joined the newly formed Bundeswehr after the rearmament of West Germany and as a Generalmajor led the 1. Luftlande-Division from 1962 to 1965.

In 1974, Gericke supported the establishment of a war cemetery in Maleme which is the final resting place for 4,465 German soldiers who lost their lives on the island of Crete during World War II.

== Awards ==
- Iron Cross (1939) 2nd Class (10 April 40) & 1st Class (12 May 1940)
- German Cross in Gold on 12 December 1943 as Major in the II./Fallschirmjäger-Regiment 6
- Knight's Cross of the Iron Cross with Oak Leaves
  - Knight's Cross on 14 June 1941 as Hauptmann and commander of the IV./Fallschirmjäger-Sturm-Regiment
  - 585th Oak Leaves on 17 September 1944 as Major and commander of Fallschirmjäger-Regiment 11

Military offices
Preceded by —	Commander of the 11th Parachute Division (Wehrmacht); March 1945 – April 1945	Succeeded by —
Preceded by —	Commander of the 21. Fallschirmjäger-Division (Wehrmacht); 5 April 1945 – 8 May 1945	Succeeded by —
Preceded by Generalmajor Hans Kroh	Commander of the 1. Luftlande-Division (Bundeswehr); 1 October 1962 – 31 March 1965	Succeeded by Generalmajor Hubert Sonneck
