= Fallschirmjäger =

Nazi German airborne forces (1936–1945)

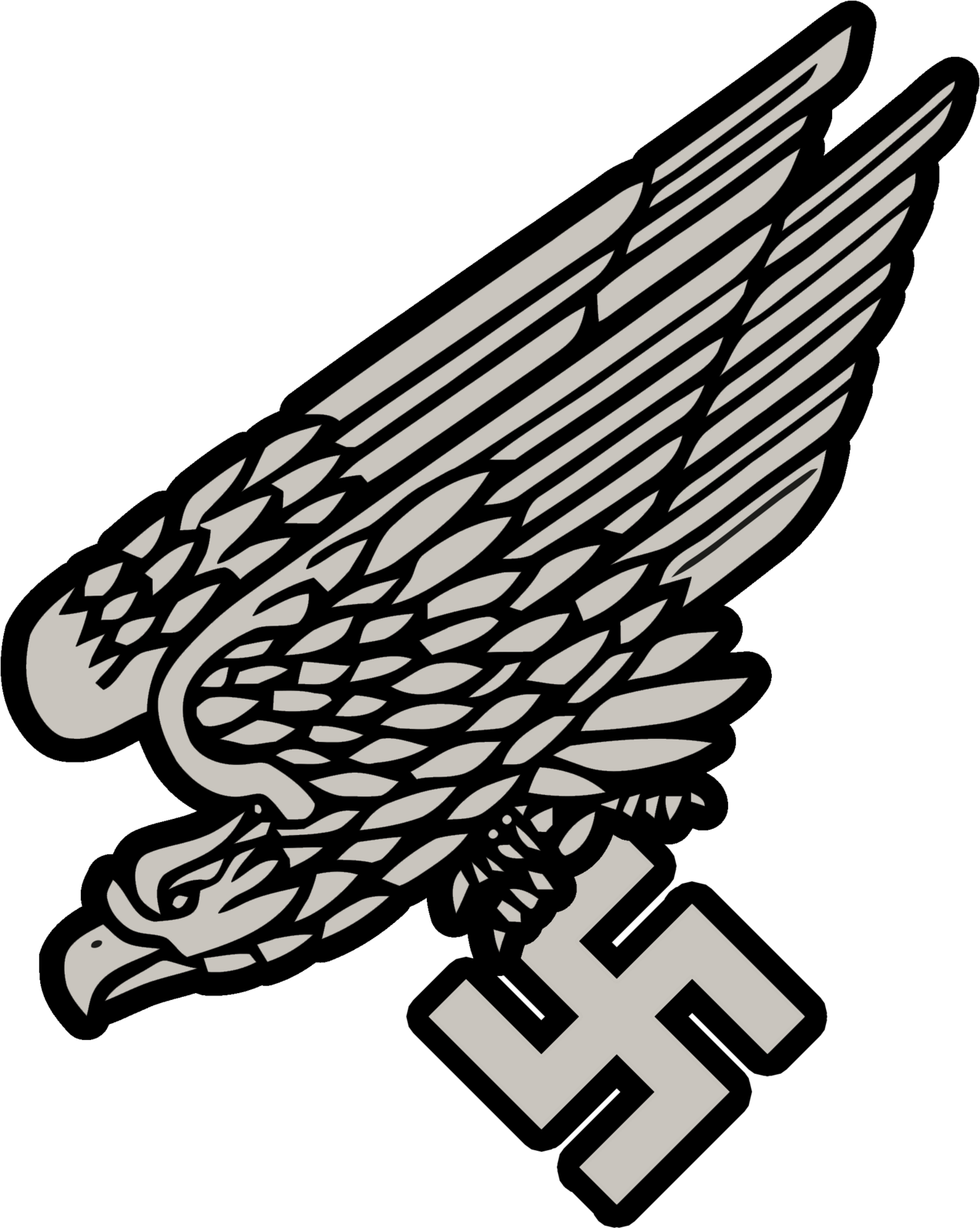
- Eagle of the German Paratroopers
- Active: 29 January 1936 – 2 May 1945
- Country: Nazi Germany
- Branch: Luftwaffe
- Type: Airborne forces
- Engagements: World War II

Commanders
- Notable commanders: Kurt Student; Richard Heidrich; Hermann-Bernhard Ramcke

The Fallschirmjäger (German: [ˈfalʃɪʁmˌjɛːɡɐ]) were the airborne forces branch of the Luftwaffe before and during World War II. They were the first paratroopers to be committed in large-scale airborne operations. They were commanded by Kurt Student, the Luftwaffe's second-in-command.

== Between the wars ==
During the interwar years, the rapid development of aircraft and aviation technology drew the attention of imaginative military planners. The idea of aerially inserting a large body of troops inside enemy territory was proposed during World War I by Brigadier General Billy Mitchell, commander of the U.S. Army Air Corps in France. However, the Entente High Command was forced to abandon the idea, as it was unprepared for such an undertaking, both logistically and in materiel.

Among the first to recognize the potential of airborne forces were Italy and the Soviet Union. The first effective means of supporting massed infantry airborne operations came with the development of the static-line parachute in Italy in 1922 whereby parachutes are attached to the inside of the aircraft and deployed automatically upon departure. This technique used in the German static line "Rückenfallschirm Zwangsauslösung" (backpack parachute static line) rig allowed jumps at lower altitudes, limiting exposure to enemy fire and providing a tighter drop zone grouping than individually deployed rip-cord type parachutes. The word Fallschirmjäger is from the German Fallschirm "parachute", and Jäger "hunter", the light infantry of the Prussian Army.

The Soviets were the first to demonstrate the military possibilities of airborne infantry in the 1930s with a series of maneuvers held in 1935 and 1936. Though somewhat crude (the Soviet paratroopers had to exit their slow-moving Tupolev TB-3 transporters through a hatch in the roof and then, crawling along the wire, position themselves along the wings and top of the fuselage, and jump together when ordered), the exercise managed to land 1,000 troops through air-drops followed by another 2,500 soldiers with heavy equipment delivered via airlandings. The gathered forces proceeded to carry out conventional light infantry attacks with the support of heavy machine guns and light artillery. Among the foreign observers present was Hermann Göring.

Impressed, Göring became personally committed to the creation of Germany's airborne arm in the 1930s. As Prussian Minister-president and Minister of the Interior, he had ordered the formation of a specialist police unit in 1933, the Polizeiabteilung Wecke, devoted to protecting Nazi Party officials. The organization of this unit was entrusted to Polizeimajor Walther Wecke of the Prussian Police Force, who had assembled a special detachment of 14 officers and 400 men within just two days. On 17 July, the detachment was officially renamed Landespolizeigruppe Wecke. On 22 December 1933, the unit was again retitled, becoming the Landespolizeigruppe General Göring. The unit carried out conventional police duties for the next two years under the command of Göring's ministerial adjutant Friedrich Jakoby, but it was Göring's intention to ultimately produce a unit that would match the Reichswehr.

In March–April 1935, Göring transformed the Landespolizei General Göring into Germany's first dedicated airborne regiment, giving it the military designation Regiment General Göring (RGG) on 1 April 1935 (after Hitler introduced conscription on 16 March 1935). The unit was incorporated into the newly formed Luftwaffe on 1 October of the same year and training commenced at Altengrabow. Göring also ordered that volunteers be drawn for parachute training. These volunteers would form a core Fallschirmschützen Bataillon ("parachute soldiers battalion"), a cadre for future Fallschirmtruppe ("parachute troops"). In January 1936, 600 men and officers formed the 1st Jäger Battalion/RGG, commanded by Bruno Bräuer, and the 15th Engineer Company/RGG and were transferred to training area Döberitz for jump training while the rest of the regiment was sent to Altengrabow. Germany's parachute arm was officially inaugurated on 29 January 1936 with an Order of the Day calling for recruits for parachute training at the Stendal Parachute Training School located 96 km (60 mi) west of Berlin. The school was activated several months after the first parachute units were established in January 1936 and was open to active and reserve Luftwaffe personnel. NCOs, officers and other ranks of the Luftwaffe were required to successfully complete six jumps in order to receive the Luftwaffe Parachutist's Badge (instituted on 5 November 1936).

== Formation ==
The 7th Air Division, later called the 1st Parachute Division, was formed in 1938. It carried out airborne operations in the early stages of the war, including the successful capture of Fort Ében-Émael in Belgium. It later fought in the Battle of Crete but after heavy losses there, Hitler refused to consider using his troops in a significant airborne role again. It became the 1st Parachute Division in 1942, when it was reformed in Russia. The division existed as a fighting unit until the German surrender in Italy of 2 May 1945, one week before the end of World War II in Europe.

The 2nd Parachute Division was formed in France under the command of Generalleutnant Hermann-Bernhard Ramcke in early 1943, based on the 2nd Parachute Brigade that had fought in North Africa. Sent to Rome as part of the occupation force when the Italian government began to reconsider its war effort, it later fought in Ukraine and in western France. The majority of the division was cut off and surrounded in Brest during the German retreat from France, resulting in the Battle for Brest, that lasted until September 1944. A new 2nd Parachute Division was formed in November 1944 and the following year was involved in fighting in Arnhem, during the Rhine crossings and in the Ruhr Pocket with Army Group B.

The 3rd and 4th Parachute divisions were formed in 1943. The 4th also contained Italian paratroopers drawn from the 184th Infantry Division "Nembo" and 185th Infantry Division "Folgore". The 3rd fought during the Normandy campaign; it was largely destroyed in the Falaise Pocket in August 1944. It was then reformed and took part in the Battle of the Ardennes, and ended the war in the Ruhr Pocket where it surrendered to US troops in April 1945. The 4th fought exclusively on the Italian front including the Battle of Anzio, Rome and on the Gothic Line. It surrendered to Allied forces in April 1945.

The 5th Parachute Division was formed in France in 1943. It was involved in the fighting in Normandy after D-Day and most of its personnel were killed or captured in the Falaise Pocket. It was reformed in the Netherlands with Luftwaffe ground crew. It fought in the Ardennes offensive and along the Rhine before its survivors surrendered at the end of the war. The 6th and 7th Parachute divisions were formed in 1944 in France and Germany respectively and fought on the western front as regular infantry. Both divisions surrendered at the end of May.

The 8th, 9th, and 10th were Fallschirmjäger by name only, as they were hastily formed in late 1944–early 1945 from a disparate collection of Luftwaffe units, including ground crews. They never reached divisional strength and were under-trained and mostly ill-prepared for combat. The 8th fought in the Netherlands before being destroyed in the Ruhr Pocket while the 9th and 10th fought on the rapidly collapsing Eastern Front, including within Germany. The 9th fought in the Battle of the Seelow Heights and in the Battle of Berlin before being destroyed in April 1945; the 10th surrendered to Soviet army forces in May 1945.

=== Equipment ===
The typical Fallschirmjäger infantry paratrooper's uniform included the paratrooper helmet M36, which differed heavily from the typical M1935, M1940, and M1942 Stahlhelm. Paratrooper helmet M36 was often worn with fine or wide netting, often made of chicken wire. During the 1939–41 period, the Fallschirmjäger uniform consisted of a pair of Field Grey trousers, a Field Blue tunic and a green jump smock. The webbing was often made of brown leather in this period, although M1940 webbing differed. The FG-42 rifle was used heavily by units of the Fallschirmjäger.

The RZ 20 Fallschirmjäger parachute only had a single contact point, making control impossible and landing difficult. Because of this they did not jump with rifles, and instead got them from a canister attached to a separate parachute.

== World War II ==
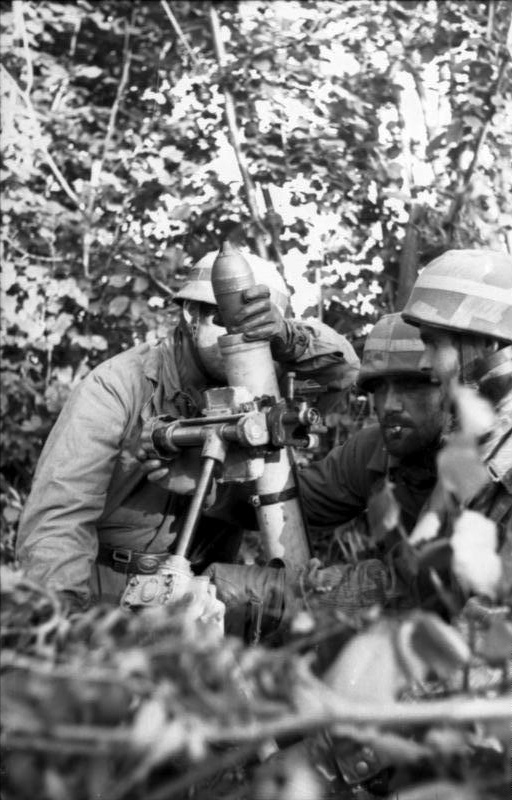
A paratroop crew firing a mortar

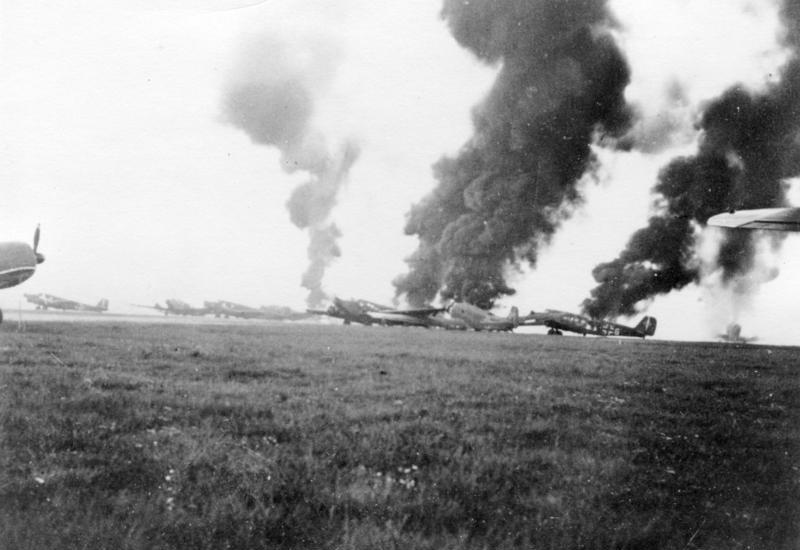
Burning German Junkers Ju 52s at Ypenburg, Netherlands, in 1940

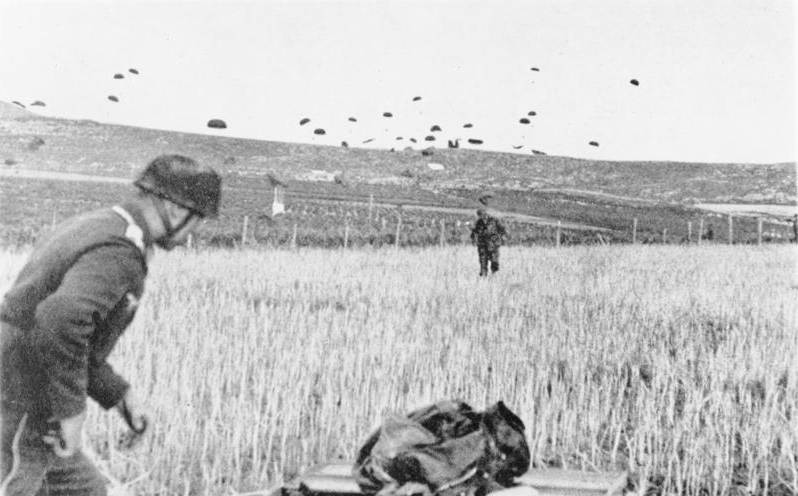
Fallschirmjäger landing on Crete in 1941

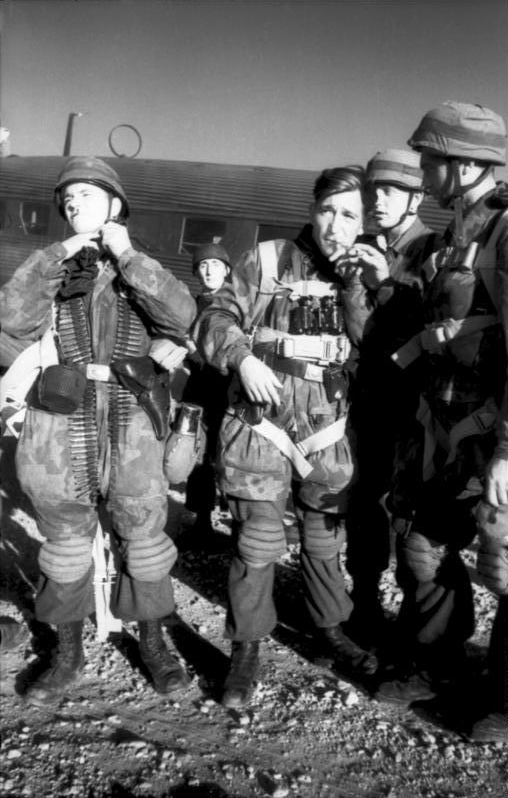
German paratroopers prepare to be flown to the Greek island of Leros in 1943.

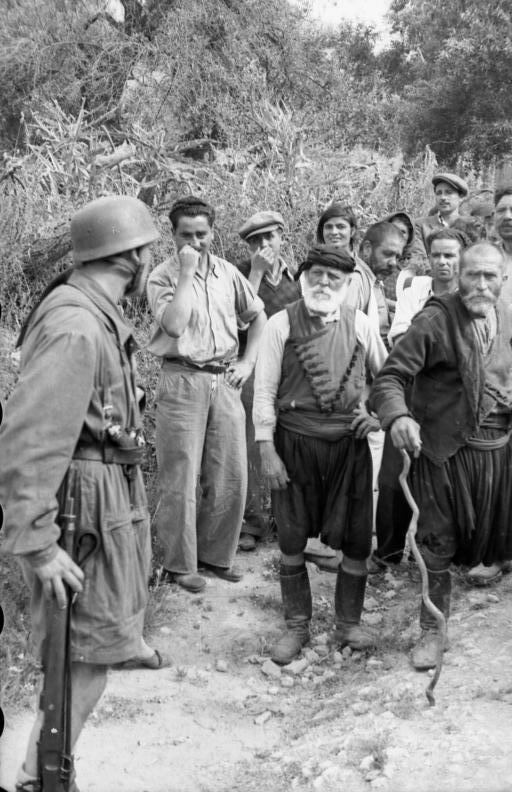
Fallschirmjäger paratroopers at Kondomari, Crete, confronting Cretan Greek villagers

=== Poland ===
During the German invasion of Poland in September 1939, the Fallschirmjäger were sent to occupy several airfields between the Vistula and Bug rivers.

=== Denmark ===
The occupation of Denmark in April 1940 was the Fallschirmjäger's first operational jump, with paratroopers landing to secure strategic airports and bridges in Denmark. Ninety-six Fallschirmjäger jumped from nine Junkers Ju 52 transport aircraft to secure Storstrøm Bridge, connecting the island of Falster with Zealand and the coastal fortress on Masnedø island. The landing opened the way for a battalion of the 198. Infanterie-Division to advance on Copenhagen by land.

Two hours later, a platoon of paratroopers from the 4th company of Fallschirmjäger Regiment I landed in Aalborg, the main city of northern Jutland. The Fallschirmjäger encountered no resistance, and in less than an hour German aircraft were landing reinforcements in large numbers.

=== Norway ===
The Fallschirmjäger's first effectively opposed landings occurred during the Norwegian Campaign, first during the initial invasion when Fallschirmjäger captured the defended air base of Sola, near Stavanger. The Fallschirmjäger also had their first defeat in Norway, when a company was dropped on the village and railroad junction of Dombås on 14 April 1940 and was destroyed by the Norwegian Army in a five-day battle.

=== Belgium and the Netherlands ===
On 10 May 1940, the Fallschirmjäger performed a successful raid on the powerful fortification known as Ében-Émael. Ében Émael consisted of multiple gun emplacements and was defended by 1,200 Belgian troops. There are few better representations by elite troops and everything was cutting edge at the time, from tactics to method of deployment. The airborne troops attacked the artillery casements and pillboxes with flame throwers, demolition charges, and hollow charge grenades. The mission was accomplished by Sturmgruppe Granit (Assault Group Granite), which consisted of only 85 soldiers. Despite being at both a numerical and firepower disadvantage, the airborne troops took control of the fort after a few hours of fighting.

During the invasion of the Netherlands over 2,000 troops of the 7th Air Division were deployed, while approximately 12,000 troops of the 22nd Air Landing Division also participated. The Fallschirmjäger successfully captured bridges at Moerdijk and Dordrecht. The airborne troops suffered heavy casualties while taking Dordrecht. The paratroopers were able to capture airfields at Valkenburg, Ockenburg, Waalhaven, and Ypenburg. Yet, the Germans failed to capture The Hague and force the Dutch to surrender. Therefore, the performance of the paratroopers in the Netherlands was mixed as far as efficiency and results was concerned. The 22nd Air Landing Division was forced to land many of its aircraft on exposed motorways because the 7th Air Division had failed to secure designated airfields. Most aircraft ended up being shot up by Dutch infantry and artillery fire. The airborne troops were able to cause disruption behind Dutch lines.

=== Greece and Crete ===
During the Greece campaign, the German airborne forces would perform their last strategic parachute and glider performances of the war. The airborne troops captured a critical bridge that crossed the canal in the Isthmus of Corinth so German forces could pursue Allied forces further in the Greek mainland. The operation did not go smoothly due in part to heavy enemy ground fire. Demolition charges were also accidentally detonated, due to carelessness, leading to damage to the bridge and heavy casualties. One group of paratroopers was accidentally dropped into the sea where they all drowned. The airborne forces did manage to capture British anti-aircraft positions, which forced the surrender of the local town. 12,000 Commonwealth and Greek troops were also captured. The German airborne forces suffered 63 killed and 174 wounded.

The final major offensive German action of the Greece campaign was the German invasion of Crete, in May 1941. The Fallschirmjäger would suffer further heavy losses during the Battle of Crete especially during Operation Merkur which would be the end of large scale airborne and glider operations for the Fallschirmjäger. The Battle for Crete would see the Germans lose approx. 3,800 dead and 2,600 wounded. The Allies' losses were approximately 1,700 dead and 15,000 captured.

=== Eastern Front ===
During the 1941 invasion of the Soviet Union, the 1st and 3rd Battalions of the 1st Parachute Regiment and the 2nd Battalion of the Luftlande-Sturmregiment (Airlanding Assault Regiment) were assigned to the Army Group North's 18th Army where they would conduct operations in the Leningrad area. The Fallschirmjäger were specifically deployed to the east of Leningrad on the River Neva to confront a Red Army effort to relieve the city. In October 1941, the German paratroopers were involved in heavy fighting against the Soviets and were successful in holding off Soviet attacks.

From late October 1941 until 4 July 1942, the 22nd Air Landing Division participated in the Siege of Sevastopol. The Fallschirmjäger overran most of the Soviet 79th Naval Infantry Brigade during combat operations. The Soviet unit tried counterattacking on 10 June, but was repulsed. The Soviet formation was effectively destroyed, with the support of the Luftwaffe, which used anti-personnel bombs against Soviet infantry caught in the open.

The 2nd Parachute Regiment, an Assault Regiment Battalion, and Antitank and Machine Gun Battalions were sent to conduct operations in Ukraine. They would be assigned to Army Group South. This force would be known as Kampfgruppe Sturm commanded by Oberst Alfred Sturm. The Fallschirmjäger suffered heavy casualties while defending a sector along the River Mius around the town of Charzysk during the winter of 1941 and into early 1942.

In March 1943, the Fallschirmjäger of the 3rd Battalion of the 4th Regiment, 7th Airborne Division defended a hill at Lushi on the Eastern Front. They were reinforced by paras from 3rd Battalion of the 3rd Regiment. Between 20 and 27 March these two battalions held off two complete Soviet divisions.

On 15 December 1943, the 2nd Parachute Division was airlifted to Kirovograd and put on the front at Klintsy. It was supported by the 11th Panzer Division and the 286th Self Propelled Artillery Brigade. The Fallschirmjäger participated in fierce fighting around Novgorodka. By 23 December the paratroopers stabilized the front but suffered heavy casualties.

In early January 1944, the Red Army conducted a new offensive against the 2nd Parachute Division. The Fallschirmjäger suffered heavy casualties. The 2nd Battalion of the 5th Regiment was destroyed. By 6 January 1944, the 7th, 5th, and 2nd Regiments had been forced to retreat from Novgorodka due to the efforts of the Red Army. The Paras dug in around Kirovograd. In March, the Red Army once again resumed operations against the 2nd Parachute Division. By the last week of the month the Red Army had forced the paras across the Southern Bug River where they would establish defensive positions on the opposite bank. By May the Red Army forced the Fallschirmjäger back to the river of Dniester. The Fallschirmjäger had been decimated by the fighting and by the end of the month the division was transferred back to Germany for refitting.

On 25 July 1944, the 21st Parachute Pioneer Battalion was positioned on the road between Dunaburg and Kovno in Lithuania. The Red Army attacked the Battalion the following day. The Battalion would be encircled and eventually destroyed. The unit would be disbanded and sent to other Fallschirmjäger units.

In April 1945, the 9th Parachute Division would be destroyed while trying to contain a Russian bridgehead on the west bank of the River Oder. What remained of the unit would be destroyed while trying to defend Berlin from the Red Army.

In April 1945, the 10th Parachute Division would be destroyed by the Red Army in Austria. The division's artillery battalion was destroyed in Feldbach by the Red Army. What remained of the unit would be destroyed north of Bruenn.

=== North Africa ===
In July 1942, the Ramcke Parachute Brigade was deployed to North Africa to assist the Axis war effort there. In late October the Brigade participated in the 2nd Battle of El Alamein. The Brigade successfully captured a British supply column which provided it with some trucks and much needed supplies for the retreat westwards.

Between November and December 1942, the 1st and 3rd Battalions of the 5th Parachute Regiment were flown into Tunisia to protect its airfields and take up defensive positions around the city of Koch during the Allied Operation Torch. It was followed closely by the 11th Parachute Pioneer Battalion under the command of Major Rudolf Witzig. It had the strength of 716 men. It took up defensive positions west of Tunis where it had a series of battles with the advance guard of the Allied spearhead. Parts of the unit had received special training in reconnaissance and intelligence gathering. This intelligence led to the last parachute drop in North Africa. The operation ended up a major failure due to mostly inexperienced and poorly trained pilots. The Fallschirmjäger were dropped too far from their targets. The paras never made it to their targets because many were captured by British patrols as they landed.

On 26 December 1942, the men of Parachute Company of the Brandenburg Regiment were transported by gliders in an operation to destroy bridges and supply routes used by the British. It too was a disaster. Some of the gliders were shot down while flying over enemy lines while others were destroyed while approaching their targets. Most of the paras were killed in the operation.

In May 1943, what was left of Fallschirmjäger units in North Africa had been captured by Allied forces. The Fallschirmjäger commanders were flown out of North Africa and managed to escape captivity.

=== Mediterranean and Italy ===
On 12 September 1943, the Fallschirmjäger conducted a successful rescue mission of Italian Prime minister Benito Mussolini at the Gran Sasso. It is known as the Gran Sasso raid. The operation received wide acclaim despite there being very little enemy resistance during the operation. Only two enemy soldiers died during the operation. The primary unit responsible for the success of the mission was Fallschirmjäger Lehr Battalion. It was considered elite of the elite and named for security reasons 1./FJR7. It was under the command of Major Harald Mors. General Kurt Student played a major role in the planning of the operation. The operation ended up being controversial due to Waffen SS legend Otto Skorzeny also participating in the operation. Skorzeny and his participating 26 Waffen SS troops managed to take much of the credit for the success of the operation despite the fact the 82 Fallschirmjäger soldiers played a more significant role during the operation. Skorzeny received a promotion to Sturmbannführer, the award of the Knight's Cross of the Iron Cross and fame that led to his "most dangerous man in Europe" image.

During 26 September 1943 to 16 November 1943, the Fallschirmjäger participated in the Battle of Leros. In October 1943, the 22nd Air Landing Division participated in the Battle of Kos. In November 1943, the 2nd Parachute Division was ordered to the Eastern Front where it took up position near the Russian held town of Zhitomir. The Red Army was to seize a communication center there and destroy the entire German Southern wing. The Red Army's primary aim was also to take Kiev. By December the Red Army had massed a large force northeast of the city. The Fallschirmjäger managed to assist other German forces in plugging the gaps created by the Soviet advance.

From 17 January to 18 May 1944, the Fallschirmjäger participated in the Battle of Monte Cassino. Allied Forces' aim was a breakthrough to Rome. At the beginning of 1944, the western half of the Winter Line was being anchored by Germans holding the Rapido-Gari, Liri and Garigliano valleys and some of the surrounding peaks and ridges. Together, these features formed the Gustav Line. Monte Cassino, a historic hilltop abbey founded in AD 529 by Benedict of Nursia, dominated the nearby town of Cassino and the entrances to the Liri and Rapido valleys. Lying in a protected historic zone, it had been left unoccupied by the Germans. They had defended some positions set into the steep slopes below the abbey's walls.

Repeated pinpoint artillery attacks on Allied assault troops caused their leaders to conclude the abbey was being used by the Germans as an observation post, at the least. Fears escalated along with casualties and in spite of a lack of clear evidence, it was marked for destruction. On 15 February American bombers dropped 1,400 tons of high explosives, creating widespread damage. The raid failed to achieve its objective, as the Fallschirmjäger occupied the rubble and established excellent defensive positions amid the ruins.

Between 17 January and 18 May, Monte Cassino and the Gustav defenses were assaulted four times by Allied troops, the last involving twenty divisions attacking along a twenty-mile front. The German defenders were finally driven from their positions, but at a high cost. The capture of Monte Cassino resulted in 55,000 Allied casualties, with German losses being far fewer, estimated at around 20,000 killed and wounded.

In September 1944, the 1st Parachute Corps fought in the Allied Offensive in Italy known as Operation Olive. The 4th Parachute Division was defending positions at the Futa and 2 Giogo Passes when the U.S. 91st and 85th divisions mounted an attack. This was followed by six days of intense fighting. American forces succeeded in capturing the 2nd Giogo Pass, Monticelli Ridge, and Monte Altuzzo, in Italy, mostly due to the overwhelming firepower of American forces. On 21 September 1944, British and Canadian forces were successful in overcoming defensive positions occupied by the 1st Parachute Corps to capture Rimini.

On 13 October 1944, Axis forces which included the 4th Parachute Division manage to halt an Allied 2nd Corps' advance south of Bologna, Italy.

On 15 April 1945, 760 Allied bombers pounded the positions of 1st Parachute Corps and other Axis units in the Argenta Gap, Italy. The paratroopers continued to fight but by 18 April, the Axis forces wavered to the massive Allied ground and aerial onslaught.

In May 1945, the remaining paratroopers of the 1st and 4th Parachute Divisions surrendered in Italy along with the remaining Axis forces. The Allied Forces had succeeded in driving Axis forces into the open where massive air support inflicted heavy casualties and material losses. The Axis campaign in Italy had ended in defeat.

=== Western Front ===
On 3 July 1944, the 2nd Parachute Corps battled the U.S. 1st Army at Coutances-Marigny-St. Lo. The Fallschirmjäger utilized the terrain of the so-called bocage and the hedgerows to their advantage to negate American superiority in both firepower and quantity of troops. The Fallschirmjäger inflicted heavy casualties on American forces due mostly to tactical superiority and the terrain preventing the Americans from utilizing their armored forces.

On 11 July 1944, the 1st Battalion, 9th Parachute Regiment executed a successful attack on the U.S. 1st Battalion, 115th Infantry Regiment. Initially, the Americans would suffer the loss of their outposts mostly due to German artillery and mortar fire. The Americans held due to their artillery and air support, and the paras eventually were forced to retreat.

On 11 July 1944, the 3rd Parachute Division suffered heavy casualties while attempting to prevent American forces from capturing the city of St. Lo. The German 12th Parachute Gun Brigade, 3rd Parachute Reconnaissance Company, and 3rd Engineer Battalion all suffered heavy casualties mostly due to outstanding American artillery fire. The Paras would hold out until 27 July due to their great effort. German forces managed to inflict 11,000 casualties on its American opponents.

On 25 July 1944, the 2nd Parachute Division was involved in the defense of Brest against the American 7th Corps. American forces suffered 4,000 casualties in its effort to invest the port. Other elements of the 2nd Parachute Division were destroyed by American armored forces while on their way to assist the 5th Parachute Division at St. Malo. American forces captured Brest on 20 September 1944. What was left of the 2nd Parachute Corps was sent to Cologne after Falaise for rest and refitting. Heydte's 6th Parachute Regiment went to Guestrow-Mecklenburg to form the foundation of a new regiment.

On 17 December 1944, during the Battle of the Bulge a kampfgruppe commanded by Oberstleutnant Freiherr von der Heydte made the last Fallschirmjäger parachute operation of the war, Operation Stösser. The plan was to capture a strategic crossroads in advance of the 12th SS Panzer Divisions breakthrough. However, the rushed training and inexperience of both the paratroopers and the Luftwaffe aircrews made the operation a fiasco; a significant proportion of the force were dropped 80km from the drop zone and others were just returned to their airfields. Only about 300 Fallschirmjäger gathered but the panzers failed to break through. As they were only equipped for a 24 hour operation, the survivors tried to return to German lines but the majority either became casualties or, including the commander, were captured.

== Casualties ==
According to the General Staff of the Wehrmacht the Fallschirmjäger had suffered the following losses by February 1945:

- 21,309 enlisted men and 732 officers killed
- 56,388 enlisted men and 1,206 officers wounded
- 43,896 enlisted men and 889 officers missing

Total: 121,593 enlisted men and 2,827 officers.

== List of units ==
After mid-1944, Fallschirmjäger were no longer trained as paratroops due to Germany's deteriorating strategic situation and fought as infantrymen. Near the end of the war, the series of new Fallschirmjäger divisions extended to thirteen on paper; the last three divisions to be created (11th, 20th and 21st) were never fully formed and saw no combat.

Army

- 1st Parachute Army

Corps

- I Parachute Corps
- II Parachute Corps

Fallschirmjäger Divisions

- 1st Parachute Division
- 2nd Parachute Division
- 3rd Parachute Division
- 4th Parachute Division – included volunteers from the Italian 184th and 185th parachute divisions
- 5th Parachute Division – last division to receive near full Fallschirmjäger training
- 6th Parachute Division
- 7th Parachute Division – previously Group Erdmann, an ad hoc collection of Luftwaffe assets on the Western Front

Infantry divisions with fallschirmjäger in title only

- 8th Parachute Division
- 9th Parachute Division
- 10th Parachute Division
- 11th Parachute Division – partially formed
- 20th Parachute Division – partially formed, did not see combat
- 21st Parachute Division – partially formed, did not see combat

Independent Regiments and brigades

- Ramcke Parachute Brigade
- Luftlande-Sturm-Regiment
- Fallschirmjäger-Regiment Hübner, subordinated to the 8th Parachute Division.

Other parachute units
Waffen-SS

- 500th SS Parachute Battalion
- 600th SS Parachute Battalion
- SS-Jagdverbände

Army

- Brandenburger Regiment
  - Fallschirmjäger-Bataillon Brandenburg
- 22nd Air Landing Division
- 91st Air Landing Division

== War crimes ==
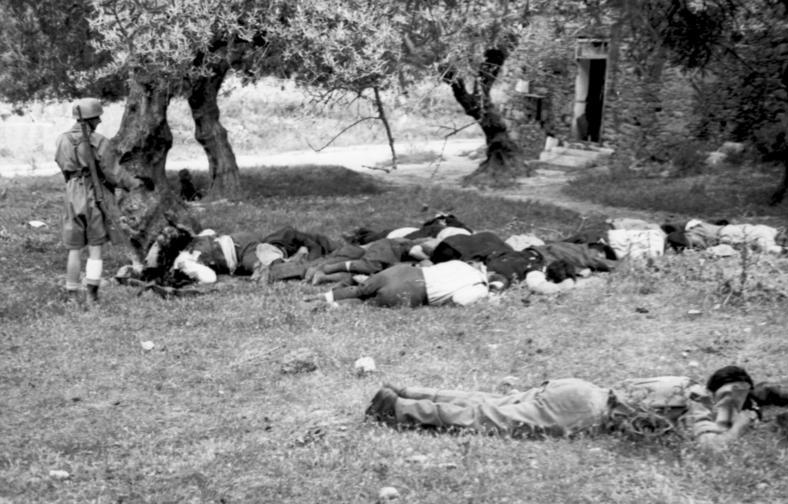
Mass murder of Cretan Greek male civilians in Kondomari, Crete by Fallschirmjäger paratroopers in 1941

During the German invasion of Crete, the Allied forces and Cretan irregulars inflicted heavy losses on the Wehrmacht. A reprisal against civilians was ordered by Student, to send a message to the Cretan population to not resist German occupation of the island. A group of Fallschirmjäger from the III Battalion of Luftlande-Sturm-Regiment 1 commanded by Oberleutnant Horst Trebes were selected to carry out the reprisal.

On 2 June 1941, the paratroopers arrived at the village of Kondomari and rounded up the male villagers and chose their victims. Between twenty-three and sixty men were killed in a firing squad while the women and children of the village watched. This mass murder became known as the Massacre of Kondomari.

As a further reprisal against the Cretans, on 3 June 1941 the 1st Air Landing Assault Regiment of the Fallschirmjäger killed 180 inhabitants in the village of Kandanos and razed the village to the ground.

== See also ==
- Rapid Forces Division
- Teishin Shudan
- Giretsu Kuteitai
- Japanese marine paratroopers of World War II
- Paratrooper
- Airborne forces
- List of paratrooper forces
- Commando
- Maquis du Vercors
- Fallschirmjägergewehr 42
- 1st Fallschirm-Panzer Division Hermann Göring

== Sources ==
- Ailsby, Christopher (2000). Hitler's Sky Warriors: German Paratroopers in Action, 1939–1945. Staplehurst, UK: Spellmount Limited. ISBN 1-86227-109-7.
- Axelrod, Alan (2008). Real History of World War II: A New Look at the Past. New York: Sterling Publishing Co Inc. p. 208. ISBN 978-1-4027-4090-9.
- Dildy, Douglas C. (2007). Denmark and Norway 1940: Hitler's boldest operation. London: Osprey Publishing Ltd. ISBN 978-1-84603-117-5.
- Forczyk, Robert (2008). Sevastopol 1942: Von Manstein's Triumph. Osprey Publishing, Oxford. ISBN 978-1-84603-221-9.
- Hodgin, John, E.German Paratroops in North Africa.
- Lindeberg, Lars (1990). 9. april; De så det ske (in Danish). Denmark: Sesam. ISBN 87-7258-504-8.
- Lopez, Oscar Gonzalez. Fallschirmjager at the Gran Sasso: The Liberation of Mussolini by the German parachutist on 12 September 1943.
- Mitcham, Samuel W. (2007). German Order of Battle, Volume Two: 291st–999th Infantry Divisions, Named Infantry Divisions, and Special Divisions in WWII. Mechanicsburg, PA: Stackpole Books. ISBN 978-0-8117-3437-0.
- McNab, Chris. The Fall of Eben Emael Belgium 1940.
- McNab, Chris. German Paratroopers.
- Sutherland, Jon & Canwell, Diane. Fallschirmjager: Elite German Paratroops in World War Two. Pen & Sword Military. ISBN 978-1-84468-889-0.
