= Iardanus (river in Crete) =

Iardanus (Ancient Greek: Ἰάρδανος), a river referred to in Homer's Odyssey, which identifies Crete as:

where the Cydonians dwelt about the streams of Iardanus.

The Cydonians were the inhabitants of the ancient city of Cydonia (presented day Chania), in northwestern Crete, and the geographer Pausanias also locates the river Iardanus at Cydonia. The river has been identified with the modern Keritis river, which rises in the White Mountains (Lefka Ori), flows north through the village of Meskla and into the sea at Platanias, a few miles west of Chania.
