= Lindsay Inglis =

New Zealand military officer, lawyer and magistrate

Lindsay Merritt Inglis
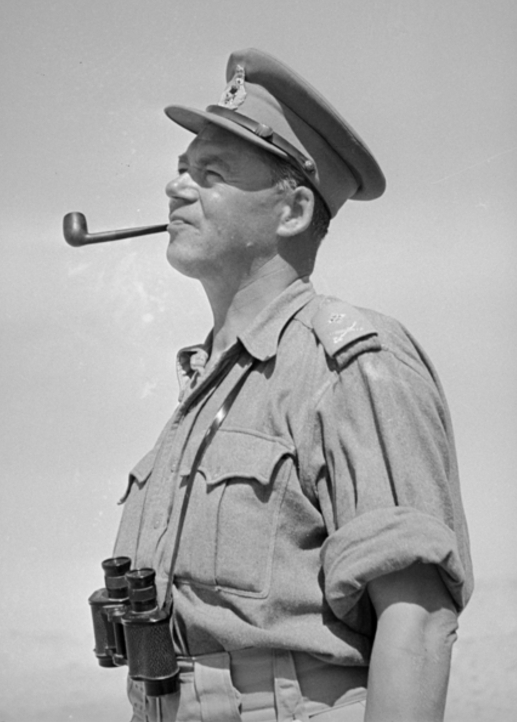
- Lindsay Inglis, pictured here when he was acting commander of the 2nd New Zealand Division, 1942.
- Born: 16 May 1894; Mosgiel, Otago, New Zealand
- Died: 17 March 1966 (aged 71); Hamilton, Waikato, New Zealand
- Military career
- Allegiance: New Zealand
- Branch: New Zealand Military Forces
- Service years: 1915–1936; 1939–1950
- Rank: Major-General
- Service number: 9495
- Commands: 2nd New Zealand Division; 4th Infantry Brigade; 9th Infantry Brigade; 27th Machine-Gun Battalion; 3rd Infantry Brigade; 1st Battalion, Canterbury Regiment
- Conflicts: First World War; Western Front; Second World War; Battle of Crete; Western Desert campaign; Italian campaign
- Awards: Companion of the Order of the Bath; Commander of the Order of the British Empire; Distinguished Service Order & Bar; Military Cross; Efficiency Decoration; War Cross (Greece)
- Other work: Magistrate

Major-General Lindsay Merritt Inglis, CB, CBE, DSO & Bar, MC, ED (16 May 1894 – 17 March 1966) was a New Zealand military officer, lawyer and magistrate. Born in Mosgiel, he volunteered for service in the New Zealand Expeditionary Force during World War I. Inglis served on the Western Front and was awarded the Military Cross for his actions during the Battle of Flers-Courcelette. He ended the war as a company commander and returned to New Zealand in 1919.

In civilian life, Inglis worked as a solicitor and barrister in Timaru and also served in the Territorial Force. He re-enlisted in the New Zealand Army during World War II and commanded the 4th Infantry Brigade in Allied campaigns in Crete and North Africa. Inglis had two periods in command of the 2nd New Zealand Division. After the war, he was appointed to a military court of the Allied Control Commission, which administered Allied-occupied Germany. He later served as chief judge of the Allied Control Commission's Supreme Court from 1947 to 1950.

== Early life ==
Inglis was born in Mosgiel, Otago, New Zealand on 16 May 1894 to a banker and his wife. After completing his education at Waitaki Boys' High School in Oamaru, he commenced legal studies at the University of Otago in 1913.

== Military career ==
In late April 1915, eight months after the outbreak of the First World War, Inglis volunteered for the New Zealand Expeditionary Force (NZEF). He had some military experience, having served as an officer in the Territorial Force with the 2nd (South Canterbury) Regiment. Posted to the New Zealand Rifle Brigade, he served in Egypt and on the Western Front. As a company commander in his battalion, he participated in the Battle of Flers-Courcelette during the Somme Offensive in September 1916. He was awarded the Military Cross for his part in the battle, after which he was the only surviving officer from his section of the front line.

Inglis later transferred to the New Zealand Machine Gun Corps, in which he commanded a company for the remainder of the war. Inglis and his company were present at the capture of Le Quesnoy in late 1918, he was discharged from the NZEF in April 1919 and returned to New Zealand.

== Interwar period ==
Inglis resumed his legal studies, completing them in 1920. He also became married to his fiancée, Agnes, and the couple had two children. Now a solicitor, he moved his young family to Timaru and established a legal practice there. He remained involved with the Territorial Force, and in 1926 was commander of 1st Battalion, Canterbury Regiment, with the rank of lieutenant-colonel. Promoted to colonel in 1931, he commanded 3rd New Zealand Infantry Brigade before retiring from the Territorial Force in 1936. As a long serving member of the territorials, he was awarded the Efficiency Decoration. In 1935, he was awarded the King George V Silver Jubilee Medal.

== Second World War ==
Inglis enlisted in the 2nd New Zealand Expeditionary Force (2NZEF) following the outbreak of the Second World War. He needed to have treatment on his thyroid before he could go on active service. He commanded the 27th Machine-Gun Battalion, part of the first echelon of the 2NZEF which had been shipped to Egypt, from December 1939 to August 1940. In early 1941, Inglis was promoted to brigadier and given command of the 9th Infantry Brigade, composed largely of training battalions.

=== Crete ===
Having missed the Battle of Greece, Inglis was appointed commander of the 4th Infantry Brigade of 2nd New Zealand Division in May 1941. During the Battle of Crete, his brigade served as the reserve for the Allied forces, codenamed Creforce and commanded by Major-General Bernard Freyberg, on Crete. The battle ended in the evacuation of Creforce to Egypt. Freyberg selected Inglis to travel to the War Office in London and provide a report on the battle. When he met with Winston Churchill, the British Prime Minister, the month after the evacuation from Crete, Inglis was critical of Freyberg's conduct of the battle and made a number of inaccurate and misleading statements. However, Inglis' own conduct in the battle had not been exemplary. At one stage, he disobeyed an order to take over a newly created reserve and remained at divisional headquarters, possibly with hopes of taking over command of the division.

=== North Africa ===
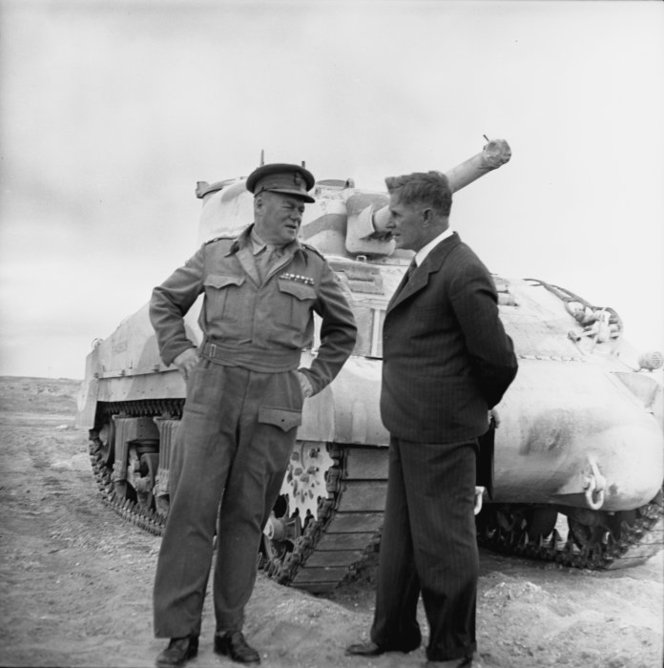
Frederick Jones, Defence Minister of New Zealand, with Inglis in front of a Sherman tank during a visit to Maadi, 6 April 1943.

Despite this show of disloyalty to his commander, Inglis remained in command of 4th Brigade through much of the North African campaign. He led his brigade in the capture of Belhamed, a hill adjacent to Sidi Rezegh, which resulted in the opening of a corridor to Tobruk during Operation Crusader, for which he was awarded the Distinguished Service Order (DSO).

After being reformed during the early part of 1942, 4th Brigade spent time in Syria with most of the 2nd New Zealand Division. In June, the New Zealanders were rushed back to Egypt after the Panzer Army Afrika attacked Gazala, near Tobruk, to begin an advance into Egypt in pursuit of the retreating Eighth Army. The division made a stand at Minqar Qaim and was surrounded by German forces on 27 June. As the Germans probed the perimeter of the New Zealand positions, Freyberg was wounded. Inglis assumed temporary command of the division and successfully led it in an outbreak from Minqar Qaim that night. He would remain as divisional commander for the next two months as Freyberg recovered, and was later awarded a bar to his DSO which acknowledged his leadership of the division during this period.

However, during this time Inglis' relationship with his brigade commanders, particularly Brigadier Howard Kippenberger, in command of the 5th Brigade, deteriorated. Kippenberger had become highly rated as a field commander during the war and Inglis may have become resentful. This was uncomfortable for Kippenberger, who had served under Inglis in the Territorial Force and considered him a mentor in the art of warfare. This was further exacerbated on 30 June when Inglis went to Cairo without informing his staff who, in his absence, subsequently asked Kippenberger to take temporary command of the division. Inglis returned on 1 July having become lost when returning from Cairo.

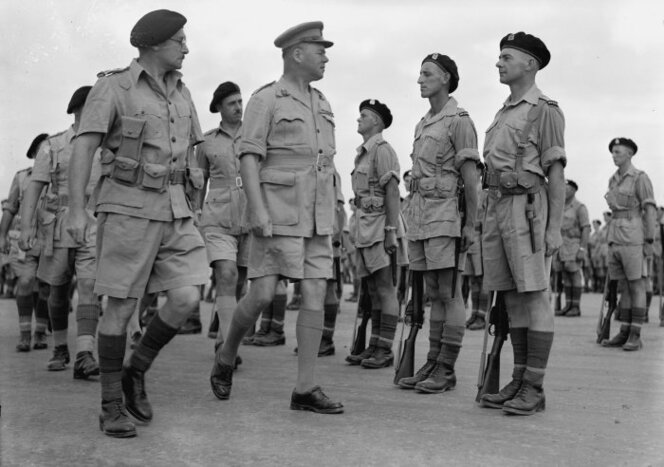
Lieutenant Colonel R. McGaffin, front left, accompanying Brigadier Leslie Inglis, the commander of 4th Armoured Brigade, on an inspection of the personnel of 19th Armoured Regiment in September 1943.

Prior to the First Battle of Ruweisat Ridge, which commenced on 14–15 July, Inglis failed to adjust his artillery support following concerns raised by Kippenberger and Jim Burrows, the commanders of the brigades involved in the planned advance on the defended ridge. Instead, he chose to rely on assurances from his corps commander, Lieutenant-General William Gott, commanding XIII Corps, that British armour would provide any necessary assistance. This proved to be a mistake; although the brigades manage to seize the ridge, they were unable to hold it in the face of stronger than expected counterattacks, and the expected armour support never fully eventuated. Afterwards, while Inglis was critical of the conduct of the brigades and laid primary blame for the failure on them and the lack of armour, he overlooked the influence of his own role as divisional commander on the outcome of the battle. An attack mounted a few days later by 6th Brigade was a further failure and highlighted Inglis' failings as a divisional commander by not ensuring adequate support from his corps commander.

In September 1942, Inglis reverted to command of 4th Brigade, and it was decided that the brigade would be converted to an armoured formation. As an infantry brigade, it had suffered heavy losses at Ruweisat Ridge. Inglis oversaw 4th Brigade's transition to armour, a process which took a nearly a year. He was again acting divisional commander from June to July 1943 when Freyberg was occupied elsewhere. Afflicted with dysentery, Inglis was repatriated to New Zealand in November 1943 for treatment.

=== Italy ===
Inglis returned to 4th Brigade, now serving on the Italian front, in March 1944. For much of the campaign in Italy the brigade did not participate in large-scale operations; instead, his armoured regiments were deployed piecemeal in support of infantry operations. In the absence of Inglis while he recovered from his illness the previous three months, Kippenberger had become the preferred acting divisional commander. Kippenberger, commanding the division while Freyberg commanded the New Zealand Corps, was wounded shortly after Inglis arrived in Italy. Command of the division passed to another brigade commander, despite Inglis' seniority. Again overlooked as temporary divisional commander in September, Inglis requested to be relieved of his command and he was promptly sent home to New Zealand. For his wartime services, he was made a Commander of the Order of the British Empire.

== Later life ==
After the end of the war in Europe, Inglis was one of New Zealand's delegates for the Allied Control Commission for Germany, which administered the now occupied country. He was appointed president of a military court in the British-controlled area of Germany dealing with crimes committed by the occupying forces. After six months in this role, in February 1947 he was promoted to major-general and made chief judge of the Allied Control Commission's Supreme Court. The following year he was appointed a Companion of the Order of the Bath.

In 1950, Inglis ended his appointment as chief judge and returned to New Zealand. He became a magistrate in Hamilton in 1953, and retired in 1965. He died in Hamilton the following year. His collection of military history books was donated to the Kippenberger Research Library in the QEII Army Memorial Museum at Waiouru.
