= List of massacres in Greece =

The following is a list of massacres that have occurred in Greece.

== Ancient Greece ==
Name	Date	Location	Deaths	Perpetrators	Notes
Astypalaia massacre	496 or 492 BC	Astypalaia	27	Kleomedes of Astypalaia	
Massacre of Argos	494 BC	Argos	6,000	Sparta	Argive survivors of the defeat at Sepeia burned alive in the sacred grove of Argos
Achaemenid destruction of Athens	480—479 BC	Athens	Unknown	Achaemenid Empire	
Olynthus Massacre	479 BC	Olynthus	All inhabitants killed	Persian Empire	
Drabeskos massacre	465 BC	Draviskos	Athenian colonists	Thracians	Athenian colonists slain by Thracians.
Massacre of Plataea	431 BC	Plataea	180	Plataea	180 Theban POWs executed
Fall of Plataea	427 BC	Plataea	200	Sparta	200 Plataean and Athenian POWs executed
First massacre of Corcyran oligarchs	427 BC	Corcyra	Unknown	Corcyran popular party	Corcyran oligarchs executed by the popular party
Mytilenean revolt	427 BC	Mytilene	1,000	Athens	Ringleaders of the rebellion executed
Helot Massacre	425 BC	Peloponnese	2,000	Sparta	2,000 Helot slaves executed by Sparta
Second massacre of Corcyran oligarchs	425 BC	Corcyra	Unknown	Corcyran popular party	Corcyran oligarchs executed by the popular party
Destruction of Scione	421 BC	Scione	All of Scione's men killed	Athens	Men killed, women and children enslaved
Massacre of Hysiae	417 BC	Hysiae	All male citizens of Hysiae killed	Sparta	
Destruction of Melos	416 BC	Milos	All Melian men killed	Athens	Women and children enslaved.
Massacre of Mycalessus	413 BC	Mycalessus	All inhabitants of Mycalessus killed	Thracian mercenaries of Athens	
Corcyra Massacre	361 BC	Corcyra	Unknown	Athens	Many Corcyrans killed
Battle of Thebes	December 335 BC	Thebes	6,000	Macedonian Army	The city was completely destroyed and 30,000 were enslaved
Argos Massacre	315 BC	Argos	500	Macedonian Army	500 Argive senators burned alive
Orchomenus Massacre	313 BC	Orchomenus	Unknown	Oligarchs supported by Macedon	
Messene Massacre	213 BC	Messene	200	Demagogues supported by Macedon	200 magistrates and their supporters killed
Maroneia Massacre	184 BC	Maroneia	Unknown	Macedonian Army	Many Maronites killed
Aetolian massacre	167 BC	Aetolia	550	Roman Army	550 Aetolian leaders killed by Roman soldiers.
Destruction of Corinth	146 BC	Corinth	All Corinthian men killed	Roman Army	Complete destruction of the city. Population partly massacred, partly enslaved.
Asiatic Vespers	88 BC	Asia (Roman province)	80,000–150,000	Kingdom of Pontus led by Mithridates VI	Romans and Italians killed. Served as a casus belli for the First Mithridatic War.
Sack of Athens	86 BC	Athens	Unknown	Roman Army	Population partly massacred and large parts of the city burned down.

== Roman or Byzantine Empire ==
Name	Date	Location	Deaths	Perpetrators	Notes
Massacre of Thessalonica	April 390	Thessalonica	7,000	Late Roman army	After orders of Emperor Theodosius I
N/A	1171	Constantinople, Genoese quarter	Unknown	Venetians	Genoese victims. This was not the first time Venetian merchants had gotten out of hand. Given much freedom and power in their trade with the Empire, they had misused this freedom. In response, Emperor Manuel I cracked down on the Venetian merchants and this led to the Byzantine–Venetian war.
Massacre of the Latins	April 1182	Constantinople	Unknown	Usurper Andronikos Komnenos and a mob of his Greek, Eastern Christian supporters	Massacre of Latins/Roman Catholics
Sack of Thessalonica (1185)	9–24 August 1185	Thessalonica	7,000	Normans of the Kingdom of Sicily	
Sack of Constantinople (1204) Fourth Crusade	1204	Constantinople	Unknown	Catholics/Crusaders	Orthodox Christians, Constantinopolitans
Venetian–Genoese War	1296	Constantinople	Unknown	Genoese	Venetian civilian victims

== Ottoman Greece ==
Name	Date	Location	Deaths	Perpetrators	Notes
Ottoman conquest of Lesbos	15 September 1461	Lesbos	300	Ottoman Army	300 Italian soldiers massacred by Ottoman Army under Mehmed II.
Ottoman reconquest of the Morea	June–September 1715	Morea	Unknown	Ottoman Army	
Siege of Nauplia	12–20 July 1715	Nauplia	25,000 were killed or sold into slavery	Ottoman Army	
Peloponnese massacres	March 1770	Peloponnese, mainly Tripolitsa	3,000–10,000 (plus 20,000 refugees)	Albanian irregulars	After the failure of Orlov Revolt.
Preveza massacre	October 1798	Preveza	Unknown	Albanian Muslims	Complete destruction, devastation of the city. The biographer of Ali Pasha, Spyros Aravantinos, states that before the massacre, the population of Preveza was 16,000, while according to the traveler Henry Holland who visited the town in 1812 – fourteen years after the event – there were only 4,000 souls.

== Greek War of Independence (1821–1832) ==
Name	Date	Location	Deaths	Perpetrators	Notes
Constantinople massacre	April–July 1821	Occurred in Constantinople, but contemporary pogrom activities spread in parts of present–day Greece (Kos, Rhodes)	Unknown	Ottoman government	
Navarino massacre	19 August 1821	Pylos	3,000	Greek irregular forces	
Massacre of Samothrace	1 September 1821	Samothrace	1,000	Ottoman army	Complete destruction, devastation of the island.
Tripolitsa massacre	23 September 1821	Tripolis	6,000–15,000	Greek irregular forces	
Chios massacre	March 1822	Chios	20,000–52,000	Ottoman government	
Naousa massacre	13 April 1822	Naousa	2,000	Ottoman army	
Kasos massacre	7 June 1824	Kasos	500	Ottoman–Egyptian army	Some 2000 women and children taken and sold into slavery
Destruction of Psara	July 1824	Psara	7,000	Ottoman army	
Third Siege of Messolonghi	April 1826	Messolonghi	8,000	Ottoman/Egyptian army	Messolonghi received the honorary title of Hiera Polis (Sacred City) by the Greek state.

== First Balkan War ==
Name	Date	Location	Deaths	Perpetrators	Notes
Servia massacre	10 October 1912	Servia, Greece	117	Ottoman Army	

== Second Balkan War ==
Name	Date	Location	Deaths	Perpetrators	Notes
Doxato Massacre	30 June 1913	Doxato	500	Turkish irregulars	
Kilkis Massacre	4 July 1913	Kilkis	74		

== World War II ==
Name	Date	Location	Deaths	Perpetrators	Notes
Missiria executions	23 and 24 June 1941	Crete	80+	Nazi Germany (German paratroopers)	
Massacre of Kondomari	2 June 1941	Crete	60	Nazi Germany (German paratroopers)	
Alikianos executions	2 June 1941 and 1 August 1941	Western Crete	180+	Nazi Germany (German paratroopers)	
Razing of Kandanos	3 June 1941	Western Crete	180	Nazi Germany (German Army)	
Doxato massacre	28–29 September 1941	Doxato	200+	Kingdom of Bulgaria (Bulgarian Royal Army)	
Drama massacre	28–29 September 1941	Drama	Up to 1,600 (Bulgarian records) Thousands (Greek estimates)	Kingdom of Bulgaria (Bulgarian Royal Army)	360–500 were killed in the city of Drama itself, while in the villages of Doxato and Choristi a total of 485 men were executed оn 29 September. According to Bulgarian military reports, up to 1,600 Greeks were killed in the uprising and in the weeks that followed, while Greek sources reported thousands of civilian casualties.
Kilkis massacre	5 October 1941	Kilkis	96	Nazi Germany (German Army)	
Kerdyllia massacre	17 October 1941	Kerdyllia	235	Nazi Germany (German Army)	
First Mesovouno massacre	23 October 1941	Mesovouno, Ptolemaida	142	Nazi Germany (German Army)	
Domenikon massacre	16–17 February 1943	Domenikon	150	Kingdom of Italy (Royal Italian Army)	
Milos executions	23 February 1943	Milos	14	Nazi Germany (German Army)	
Tsaritsani massacre	12 March 1943	Tsaritsani	40–45	Kingdom of Italy (Royal Italian Army)	
Feneos executions	March 1943–June 1944	Feneos	1,071+	Mainly OPLA	The local monastery functioned as a concentration camp.
Kournovo massacre	6 June 1943	Kournovo, Thessalia	106	Kingdom of Italy (Royal Italian Army)	
Viannos massacres	14–16 September 1943	Viannos and Ierapetra regions	500+	Nazi Germany (Generalleutnant Friedrich–Wilhelm Müller leading the 65th Regiment of the 22nd Luftlande Infanterie–Division)	
Massacre of the Acqui Division	21 September 1943	Kefalonia, Greece	5,000	Nazi Germany (German Army)	Dramatized in the film Captain Corelli's Mandolin.
Kommeno massacre	16 August 1943	Kommeno	317	Nazi Germany (German Army)	
Razing of Vorizia	27 August 1943	Vorizia	5	Nazi Germany (German Army)	
Paramythia executions	19–29 September 1943	Paramythia	201	Nazi Germany (Cham Albanian paramilitary, German Army troops)	
Massacre of Kos	4–6 October 1943	Kos	103	Nazi Germany (Wehrmacht)	
Lyngiades massacre	3 October 1943	Ligiades	83	Nazi Germany (German Army troops)	
Burnings of Kali Sykia	6 October 1943	Kali Sykia, Rethymno, Crete	13	Nazi Germany (Jagdkommando Schubert)	
Kallikratis executions	8 October 1943	Kallikratis	30+	Nazi Germany (Jagdkommando Schubert, German Army troops)	
Milies massacre	14 October 1943	Milies	28–33	Nazi Germany (Wehrmacht)	
Pogrom against the wounded veterans	30 November 1943	Athens	283	Nazi Germany (Security Battalions)	
Massacre of Kalavryta	13 December 1943	Kalavryta	693	Nazi Germany (German Army troops)	
Drakeia massacre	18 December 1943	Drakeia, Mount Pelion	115	Nazi Germany (4th SS Polizei Panzergrenadier Division)	
Elatohori massacre	17 January 1944	Elatohori, Pieria	32	Nazi Germany (Wehrmacht)	
Kleisoura massacre	5 April 1944	Kleisoura, Kastoria	270–280	Nazi Germany (Wehrmacht) Kingdom of Bulgaria (Bulgarian Royal Army)	
5/42 Evzone Regiment dissolution	17 April 1944	Phocis, Central Greece	200+	ELAS troops	Colonel Dimitrios Psarros also executed.
Second Mesovouno massacre	22 April 1944	Mesovouno, Ptolemaida	185	Nazi Germany (Wehrmacht)	
Pyrgoi (formerly Katranitsa) massacre	23 to 24 April 1944	Pyrgoi	327	Nazi Germany (German Army)	
Executions of Kaisariani	1 May 1944	Kaisariani	200	Nazi Germany (German Army)	
Haidari massacre	16 May 1944	Haidari	200	Nazi Germany (German Army)	
Limnes massacre	23 to 27 May 1944	Limnes, Argolida	86–88	Nazi Germany (Wehrmacht)	
Distomo massacre	10 June 1944	Distomo	218	Nazi Germany (German SS troops)	
Massacre of Pikermi	21 July 1944	Pikermi	54	Nazi Germany (German Army)	54 Greek civilians were executed by the German occupation force in Pikermi, as retaliation for an attack by the resistance group ELAS.
Massacres of Mousiotitsa	25 July 1943	Mousiotitsa	153	Nazi Germany (German Army)	
Chéli massacre	29 July 1944	Chéli	88	National Liberation Front	
Razing of Anogeia	13 August 1944	Anogeia	25	Nazi Germany (German Army)	
Executions of Kokkinia	17 August 1944	Kokkinia	300+	Nazi Germany (German Army troops, Security Battalions)	
Skourvoula executions	14 August 1944	Skourvoula, Crete	36+	Nazi Germany (German Army)	
Gerbesi massacre	15 August 1944	Gerbesi	23	Greek People's Liberation Army	
Limnes massacre	19 August 1944	Limnes, Argolida	25	National Liberation Front	
Holocaust of Kedros	22 August 1944	Amari Valley	164	Nazi Germany (German Army)	
Malathyros executions	28 August 1944	Malathyros, Crete	61	Nazi Germany (German Army)	
The Massacre of Chortiatis	2 September 1944	Chortiatis	146	Nazi Germany (German Army)	Perpetrated by Friedrich Schubert
Giannitsa massacre	14 September 1944	Giannitsa	10	Nazi Germany (German Army, Security Battalions)	
Executions of Meligalas	16 September 1944	Meligalas	c.1,000	ELAS troops	
Aigaleo massacre	29 September 1944	Aigaleo	65 (official number), estimates up to 150	Nazi Germany (Wehrmacht)	
Executions of ULEN/Peristeri	December 1944 (Dekemvriana)	Athens	3,000+ (unknown exactly)	OPLA, other minor communist groups	

== Others ==
Name	Date	Location	Deaths	Perpetrators	Notes
Candia massacre	6 September 1898	Crete	500–800	Armed Muslim irregular groups	
Kalamata dock workers' strike	9 May 1934	Kalamata	5	Greek Police, Greek Army	
Massacre of the First Sapper Battalion	29 February—1 March 1948	Makronisos	350	Third Sapper Battalion, Prison Guards	Part of the Greek Civil War
Athens Polytechnic uprising	14–17 November 1973	National Technical University of Athens	40	Greek Junta	
