= Battle of Hysiae =

Battle of Hysiae can refer to:

- Battle of Hysiae (c. 669 BC) between the Spartans and the Argives
- Battle of Hysiae (417 BC) between the Spartans and the Argive-Athenian alliance
