= 417th =

417th may refer to:

- 417th Bombardment Group, inactive United States Air Force unit
- 417th Bombardment Squadron a United States Air Force unit
- 417th Flight Test Squadron (417 FLTS), part of the 412th Test Wing based at Edwards Air Force Base, California
- 417th Weapons Squadron, inactive United States Air Force unit

== See also ==
- 417 (number)
- 417, the year 417 (CDXVII) of the Julian calendar
- 417 BC
