= 417 BC =

417 BC in various calendars
Gregorian calendar	417 BC; CDXVII BC
Ab urbe condita	337
Ancient Egypt era	XXVII dynasty, 109
Pharaoh	Darius II of Persia, 7
Ancient Greek Olympiad (summer)	90th Olympiad, year 4
Assyrian calendar	4334
Balinese saka calendar	N/A
Bengali calendar	−1010 – −1009
Berber calendar	534
Buddhist calendar	128
Burmese calendar	−1054
Byzantine calendar	5092–5093
Chinese calendar	癸亥年 (Water Pig); 2281 or 2074 — to — 甲子年 (Wood Rat); 2282 or 2075
Coptic calendar	−700 – −699
Discordian calendar	750
Ethiopian calendar	−424 – −423
Hebrew calendar	3344–3345
- Hindu calendars
Vikram Samvat	−360 – −359
Shaka Samvat	N/A
Kali Yuga	2684–2685
Holocene calendar	9584
Iranian calendar	1038 BP – 1037 BP
Islamic calendar	1070 BH – 1069 BH
Javanese calendar	N/A
Julian calendar	N/A
Korean calendar	1917
Minguo calendar	2328 before ROC 民前2328年
Nanakshahi calendar	−1884
Thai solar calendar	126–127
Tibetan calendar	阴水猪年 (female Water-Pig) −290 or −671 or −1443 — to — 阳木鼠年 (male Wood-Rat) −289 or −670 or −1442

Year 417 BC was a year of the pre-Julian Roman calendar. At the time, it was known as the Year of the Tribunate of Tricipitinus, Lanatus, Crassus (or Cicurinus) and Axilla (or, less frequently, year 337 Ab urbe condita). The denomination 417 BC for this year has been used since the early medieval period, when the Anno Domini calendar era became the prevalent method in Europe for naming years.

== Events ==
=== By place ===
==== Greece ====
- Following the loss by Athens and its allies in the Battle of Mantinea, a political "tug of war" takes place in Athens. Alcibiades joins forces with Nicias against Hyperbolus, the successor of the demagogue politician Cleon as champion of the common people. Hyperbolus tries to bring about the ostracism of either Nicias or Alcibiades, but the two men combine their influence and induce the Athenian people to expel Hyperbolus instead.
- The second battle of Hysiae is fought between the armies of Sparta and Argos during the Peloponnesian War. The Spartan King Agis II was seeking to restore the pro-Spartan faction evicted from Argos by Alcibiades. While he failed to take the city of Argos, he did capture and subsequently destroy the town of Hysiae, killing all its male inhabitants.
