= List of massacres in the Byzantine Empire =

List of massacres in the Byzantine Empire may refer to:

- List of massacres in Greece
- List of massacres in Turkey
