= Sonderkommando (disambiguation) =

Sonderkommando ("special unit" in German) most commonly refers to the Sonderkommandos in Nazi Germany's extermination camps but may also refer to:

- Sonderkommando Arājs, a Latvian auxiliary police force during the Nazi German occupation
- Sonderkommando Blaich, a Luftwaffe operation in North Africa
- Sonderkommandos of Einsatzgruppen
- Sonderkommando Dänemark, a counterintelligence unit in occupied Denmark during WWII
- Sonderkommando Elbe, a Luftwaffe task force
- Sonderkommando photographs, photos taken by a Jewish Sonderkommando in KL Auschwitz
- SS-Sonderkommandos, special action units of the Schutzstaffel
- Sonderkommando Nord, RSHA's unit leading the pro-German resistance movement in Finland
- Sonderkommando 2000, a counterintelligence unit in occupied Greece during WWII
- Sonderkommando Rote Kapelle, a counterintelligence unit in occupied Paris during WWII
- Sonderkommando Pola, a commanding unit of Pola Flotilla during WWI
- Sonderkommando Kaiserliche Marine Türkei, a German unit tasked with aiding Ottoman allies defending the Dardanelles in WWI
