= Georgios Poulos =

Greek Nazi collaborator (1889–1949)

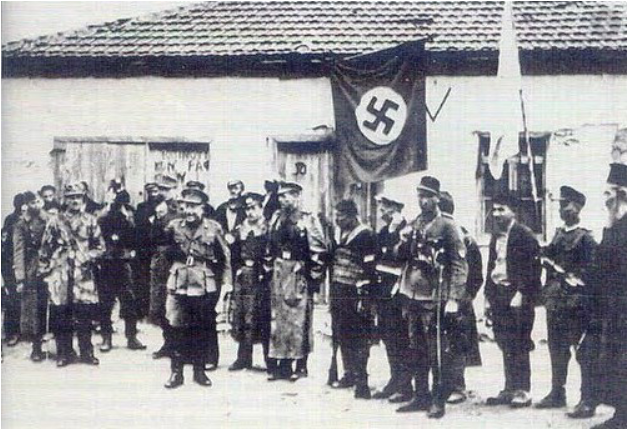
Georgios Poulos speaks at the Pelargos.

Georgios Poulos (Greek: Γεώργιος Πούλος; 1889, Platanos, Greece – 11 June 1949) was a Greek Army colonel and Nazi collaborator during the Axis occupation of Greece during World War II.

== Biography ==
He was born in 1889 in Romania, hailing from Platanos, Aetolia-Acarnania. He seems to have participated in the Greco-Turkish War, while he participated in the 1935 Greek coup d'état attempt as a lieutenant colonel, leaving the army after its failure.

A longtime ultra-nationalist, Colonel Poulos was fanatically anti-monarchist and anti-communist. In 1943, he organised and led the Poulos Verband, the most feared collaborationist death squad in occupied-Greece. During 1944, his forces were reinforced by the Jagdkommando Schubert, a paramilitary unit raised in Crete by the notorious Friedrich Schubert.

Poulos participated in Sonderkommando 2000, a German counter intelligence unit which aimed at infiltrating the Greek resistance movement. Poulos also worked for the National Union of Greece (EEE), an antisemitic party sponsored by the SS. He and his forces organised and committed many crimes in the rural areas of Greece; the most notorious was the attack on Giannitsa in September 1944, during which about a hundred peasants were executed. The aim of the executions was to instill terror into the supporters of the left-wing EAM/ELAS, as Giannitsa was considered an important resistance centre. However, Poulos and his men killed in an indiscriminate fashion and it is probable that most of the victims had minimal involvement with the Resistance. In March 1945, Poulos and his unit were transferred to Kitzbühel, Austria. They remained there until the end of the war and were captured by the US 7th Army, who later surrendered them to Greece.

Colonel Poulos was convicted of treason and executed in Athens in June 1949.

== See also ==
- Security Battalions
