= Pheidon =

King of Argos, son of Aristodamidas

Pheidon (Ancient Greek: Φείδων) was an Argive ruler, usually dated to the first half of the 7th century BCE (perhaps reigning c. 680 – c. 660). While his dating is a matter of dispute and much of the information about him is fragmentary, he is almost always described as a powerful and expansionist ruler. He consolidated Argive control over the surrounding region of the Argolid. If the 7th-century dating is correct, then he defeated Sparta at the Battle of Hysiae in 669/8. He is also remembered for forcibly taking control of the presidency over the Olympic games (usually dated to 668 BCE) and creating or standardizing weights and measures which were then used throughout the Peloponnese and called Pheidonian after him. He may have intervened in the affairs of other Greek city-states on other occasions, and one late author claims that he died while involved in civil conflict in Corinth. He was remembered as a tyrant (Aristotle cites him as an example of a king who became a tyrant), perhaps for his demonstration of power at the Olympic festival.

== Dating ==
The first half of the 7th century BCE (perhaps 680–660) is regarded as the most likely date for Pheidon's reign. This dating is based on Herodotus's report that Pheidon intervened at the Olympic festival, expelling the Elean presiding officers and presiding over the competition himself. Herodotus does not provide a date for this event, but assertions by the later authors Eusebius and Pausanias have been used to argue that in 668 BCE control of the Olympic festival (traditionally the privilege of the Eleans) was taken over by the Pisatans. The most widespread view among historians is that Pheidon helped the Pisatans take over the Olympic festival in 668, which means he lived in the first half of the 7th century BCE. However, G. L. Huxley proposes an 8th-century date for Pheidon, while Thomas Kelly argues in favor of a 6th-century dating. Additionally, the 7th-century dating appears to be contradicted by another report by Herodotus that a son of Pheidon was among the suitors of Agariste, daughter of the Sicyonian tyrant Cleisthenes, who lived in the 6th century. It may be, however, that this is a confusion rooted in the folkloric nature of the report. (Reginald Walter Macan first proposed that the story of the wooing of Agariste was adapted from the Indian fable of the "Dancing Peacock.") Alternatively, it may be the case that Herodotus confused two different figures named Pheidon.

== Life and reign ==
Information on Pheidon is largely fragmented, although he is almost always described as a powerful and expansionist ruler. Pheidon belonged to the Dorian Greek ruling dynasty of Argos, which claimed descent from the legendary Temenus, a Heraclid (descendant of Heracles) who is said to have received the Argolid as his share after the Heraclid invasion of the Peloponnese. Ephorus places him ten generations after Temenus. If the 7th-century dating for Pheidon is correct, then his reign coincides with the zenith of Argive power. He expanded Argive rule over the Argolid; thus, Ephorus credits him with reuniting the Argive kingdom, supposedly broken up after the time of Temenus. However, it is not clear how far east over the Argolid Peninsula his rule extended. Argive expansion resulted in conflict with another expanding Peloponnesian state, Sparta. In Richard Tomlinson's view, it is possible that Argos at this time joined an anti-Spartan coalition with other Peloponnesian states in reaction to the Spartan conquest of Messenia. In 669/8, the Argives defeated the Spartans at Hysiae and took control of the plain of Thyrea, located on the frontier between the Argos and Sparta. This may have been the limit of Pheidon's expansion southwards. Some scholars have hypothesized that Pheidon was one of the first rulers to put the hoplite phalanx to use and that this was what allowed Argos to achieve victory over Sparta.

Pheidon's intervention in the Olympic festival, usually dated to 668, forced out the Elian officers presiding over the games, after which Pheidon presided himself. This may have served more than one purpose: as an impressive demonstration of power, and as a political action to help the Pisatans achieve some autonomy from Elis. Another policy attributed to Pheidon is the creation or standardization of Peloponnesian weights and measures. Short iron spits have been found during the excavation of the temple of Hera in Argos, which could have been dedicated by Pheidon when establishing standard measurements. Later, the common system of weights and measures used in the Peloponnese was called Pheidonian. Reports that Pheidon minted the first Greek coins are now recognized as anachronistic: coins were not minted in Greece until the last quarter of the 7th century, in Aegina.

Pheidon may have also intervened in the affairs of other Greek city-states on other occasions. It has been suggested that he aided Megara in its border dispute with Corinth. This is connected with a claim made by Nicolaus of Damascus (1st century BCE) that Pheidon was killed in Corinth while intervening in civil conflict there. According to another story recorded by Herodotus, Argive troops defeated the Athenians after the latter invaded Aegina. Historian Raphael Sealey writes that it is not unlikely that Pheidon exerted Argive influence in the northeastern Peloponnese, but the evidence for connecting him with events in Corinth, Megara, and Aegina is not strong.

Pheidon was succeeded by his son Lacedas. His grandson Meltas was the last king of Argos. The Byzantine author Syncellus cites a genealogy which traces the ancestry of the kings of Macedon to another son of Pheidon called Caranos.

== Legacy ==
Herodotus (6.127) writes of Pheidon that he acted "with the most hubris of all the Greeks." In his Politics, Aristotle refers to Pheidon as a king who became a tyrant; this appears to be a view that Aristotle drew from his sources, as he does not provide support for the claim. This view of Pheidon as a tyrant may have developed during his reign or afterwards. According to Sealey, this was likely a result of his "ostentatious display of power" when he seized the presidency of the Olympic games, which reminded people of his contemporary, King Gyges of Lydia. (This is based on the hypothesis that tyrant was originally the Lydian word for king which came to be associated with "oriental wealth and display of wealth" among the Greeks.)
