= Battle of Hysiae (c. 669 BC) =

Battle between Archaic Greek city-states of Sparta and Argos

Date	c. 669 BC
Location	Hysiae, Argolis
Result	Argive victory

Belligerents
Sparta	Argos

Commanders and leaders
	Pheidon (possibly)

A Battle of Hysiae is recorded by Pausanias as having been fought at Hysiae in the Argolis, possibly c. 669 BC during the rule of the Argive tyrant Pheidon. One of the few major setbacks suffered by the Spartans in conflict with their neighbors, the battle was mentioned by Pausanias as a significant victory for Argos. Pausanias reports no details of the battle, although he was shown the burial-site of the Argive dead.

Nothing else is known about the conflict, except that the location in the Argolis suggests the repulse of a Spartan invasion. Hysiae was a stronghold located to the southwest of Argos and east of Tegea, near the border with Sparta. Modern scholars suggest that the battle marked a turning point in military history, because their defeat led the Spartans to change their military strategy, adopting the phalanx of hoplites in place of the loose spear-throwing formations prevalent until then. In the centuries to come, the phalanx revolutionised warfare in the classical world.

== Battle ==
Conventional warfare at this time usually involved armies meeting in an open field. The reason why the Argives chose to give battle at Hysiae is unclear. By this time, the aspis, a shield of Argive design, gave their army an advantage over the Spartans, who were annihilated by their opponents. If the battle occurred within the walls of Hysiae, the Spartan army could have been packed in by the proto-phalanx employed by the Argives. This formation may have been the invention of Pheidon.

=== Sources ===
This battle, recorded only by Pausanias about eight hundred years later, is not to be confused with the battle that occurred there in 417 BC, recorded by Thucydides shortly afterwards. Pausanias relates:

Here are common graves of the Argives who conquered the Lacedaemonians in battle at Hysiae. This fight took place, I discovered, when Peisistratus was archon at Athens, in the fourth year of the twenty-seventh Olympiad, in which the Athenian, Eurybotus, won the foot-race. On coming down to a lower level you reach the ruins of Hysiae, which once was a city in Argolis, and here it is that they say the Lacedaemonians suffered their reverse.

— trans. W.H.S. Jones and H.A. Omerod

The fourth year of the twenty-seventh Olympiad corresponds with 669 or 668 BC. The dating of the Argive tyrant Pheidon is very uncertain, but some scholars have suggested that this Argive defeat of Sparta occurred when Pheidon was king of Argos, since Pheidon was famed for his military success and daring. Some scholars suggest that the battle of Hysiae was invented by the Argives, or that Pausanias misunderstood what he had been told.

== Bibliography ==
- Pausanias, Hellados Periegesis (Description of Greece).
- Dictionary of Greek and Roman Geography, William Smith, ed., Little, Brown and Company, Boston (1854).
- Antony Andrewes, The Greek Tyrants, University of Virginia (1956).
- Thomas Kelly, "Did the Argives Defeat the Spartans at Hysiae in 669 B. C.?", in The American Journal of Philology, vol. 91, No. 1 (Jan. 1970), pp. 31–42.
- Richard Stillwell and William L. MacDonald (eds.), The Princeton Encyclopedia of Classical Sites, Princeton University press (1976).
- Jonathan M. Hall, A History of the Archaic Greek World, ca. 1200–479 BCE, Blackwell Publishing, Malden (2007).
