= Battle of Orneae =

Engagement during the Peloponnesian War (417 BC)

- Part of Peloponnesian War
Date	417 BC
Location	Orneae, Argolis
Result	Athenian/Argive Victory

Belligerents
Orneae	Argos; Athens

Strength
Unknown	1,200 Hoplites; 40 Triremes

The Battle of Orneae was an engagement that took place in the winter of 417 BC during the Peloponnesian War in the city of Orneae, between a Spartan garrison left in Orneae after the Battle of Hysiae and the forces of Argos and Athens.

== Background and Battle ==
After the decisive defeat of Argos at Hysiae and the razing of the stronghold, the Spartan forces took the city of Orneae, fortified it, and settled the exiles from Argos in the city. The stronghold was left with a strong garrison that they then ordered to harass Argolis.

After the withdrawal of the Spartan army, the Athenians sent a force of 40 triremes and 1,200 hoplites to aid the city of Argos in expelling the garrison and taking the city.

The Argive/Athenian army then took Orneae by storm, both taking the city and being able to expel the garrison, and execute some of the exiles. The rest were driven out from the city of Orneae.
