= Kato Symi =

Kato Symi Κάτω Σύμη
- Community
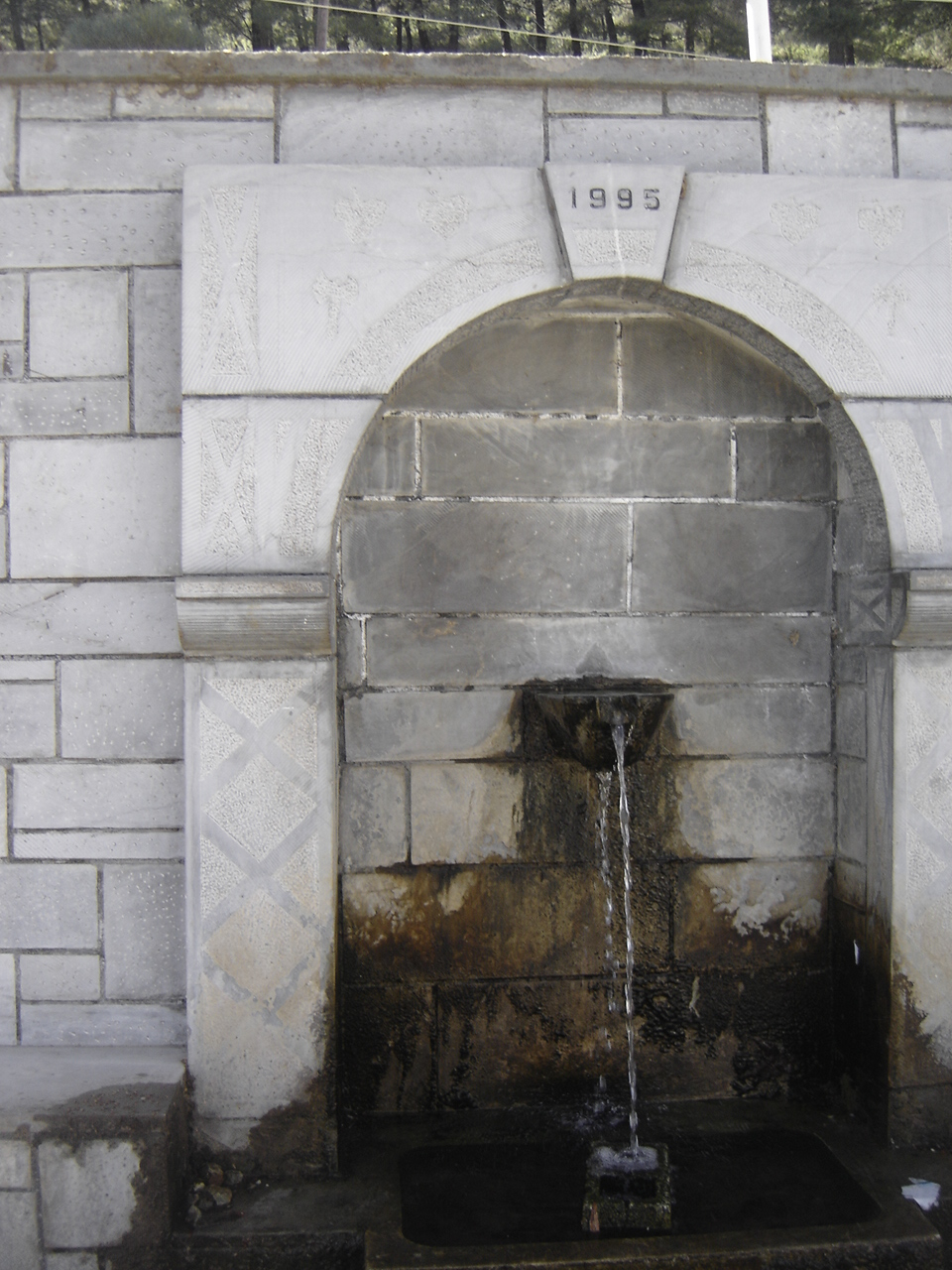
- Α fountain in Kato Symi

- Location within Greece
- Coordinates: 35°02′49″N 25°29′20″E
- Country: Greece
- Administrative region: Crete
- Regional unit: Heraklion
- Municipality: Viannos

Population (2021)
  - Community: 52
- Time zone: UTC+2 (EET)
  - Summer (DST): UTC+3 (EEST)

Kato Symi (Greek: Κάτω Σύμη) is a small historic village of Crete, in Heraklion regional unit, 31 km (19 mi) from Ierapetra and 74 km (46 mi) from Heraklion city. Today it belongs to Viannos municipality and borders the Ierapetra municipality. It lies about 780 m (2,560 ft) above sea level, south of Mount Dikti in a verdant mountainous area, which is probably the most wooded of Crete. Near the village, at an altitude of 1,200 m (3,900 ft), lies the ancient sanctuary of Hermes and Aphrodite. It is dated from the middle Minoan period and had been used for worship for more than 1,000 years. Kato Simi has been destroyed three times, by Arabs, Turks and finally by the German army in World War II, when it was the center of resistance of the Viannos–Ierapetra area against the Nazi occupying forces.
