= Milos executions =

Execution of Greek civilians

Coordinates: 36.725°N 24.445°E

The Milos executions (Greek: εκτελέσεις στη Μήλο) refer to the mass execution by firing squad of 14 male civilians from the island of Milos in Greece by German forces on 23 February 1943 during World War II. The victims were accused of looting material owned by the German military that was washed up after the sinking of the German cargo ship SS Artemis Pitta by Allied aircraft.

== Background ==
=== Geography ===
Milos is the fifth largest island of Cyclades and lies midway between Piraeus and Crete. Due to its large, natural harbor it has historically been important for maritime shipping. During the tripartite Axis occupation of Greece, Milos was part of the German zone. The Germans had installed a permanent garrison and built several air raid shelters.

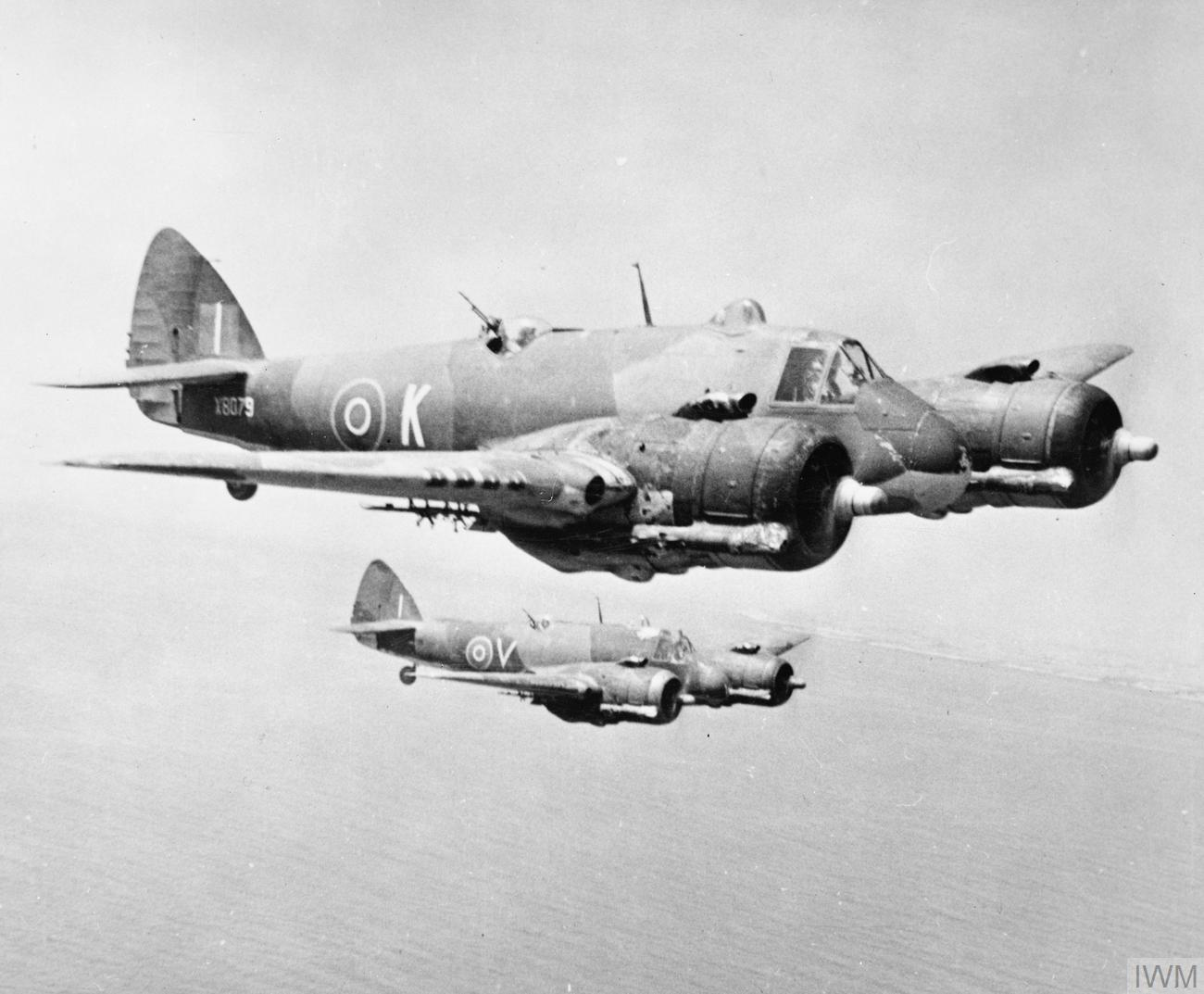
Beaufighters over Malta

=== The vessel ===
SS Artemis Pitta (Greek: Άρτεμις Πίττα, ex names Herold, Maid of Athens) was a 240 ft, 1,433-gross register ton (GRT) cargo steamer built in 1906 by Stettiner Oderwerke at Stettin, German Pomerania. At the outbreak of the war, she was owned by G.N. Pittas Bros. During the Battle of Greece, on 6 April 1941, Artemis Pitta was sunk by the Luftwaffe in Piraeus. After being raised and repaired, she was requisitioned by the Kriegsmarine and manned by a civilian Greek crew.

=== The air raid ===
On 21 February 1943, the SS Artemis Pitta was moored at the port of Adamantas. She was bound for Crete, laden with fuel, ammunition and other military supplies. The vessel was sighted by three RAF Beaufighters which torpedoed and blew her up, killing 15 of her crew. Pushed by the north wind, debris and cargo from the wreck washed up on Achivadolimni (Αχιβαδολίμνη) beach across Adamantas.

== The executions ==
Noticing that items from the wreck, (esp. barrels) were being washed up, many locals headed to the beach to search for anything that might be useful. Objects from vessels sunk in the Aegean were often washed up ashore and it was a common practice among the locals to collect them without any German opposition. This time, however, the oil barrels from the cargo were very valuable to the Germans who did not tolerate their appropriation. A German patrol arrested everyone on the spot; further interrogations identified more locals who had been involved. Of the total 25 arrested, 14 were selected and accused of looting German army property. On 23 February they were taken to Alyki (Αλυκή) beach and shot by a firing squad. The execution order was signed by Hans Kawelmacher, the naval commander of Milos who in 1941 had been involved in the mass execution of Jews, Gypsies and other prisoners in the Latvian city of Liepāja.

== Aftermath ==
A memorial service in the memory of victims is held annually. A commemorative plaque with the names of those who perished was installed in 1992.

== See also ==
- Military history of Greece during World War II
