= Pogrom against the wounded veterans =

The pogrom against the disabled took place on the night of 30 November 1943 in Athens, Greece by the collaborationist Security Battalions. Disabled veterans from the Greco-Italian front of the World War II who were treated in hospitals in Athens were arrested by the Security Battalions who then handed them over to the Nazi forces in the prisons of Haidari and Hatzikosta. 283 disabled veterans were executed.

== Background ==
After the fall of the Greek front and the German invasion of Greece about 15,000 disabled from the war found shelter in the hospitals of Athens. Disabled people lived in harsh conditions but organized to improve the living conditions in the hospitals creating Hospital Committees to manage the food and medical supplies. They participated in the demonstrations in March 1943 against the mobilization of Greeks to the Eastern front and in July 1943 against the expansion of the Bulgarian occupation zone. As a result, the disabled war veterans became a target for the Security Battalions.

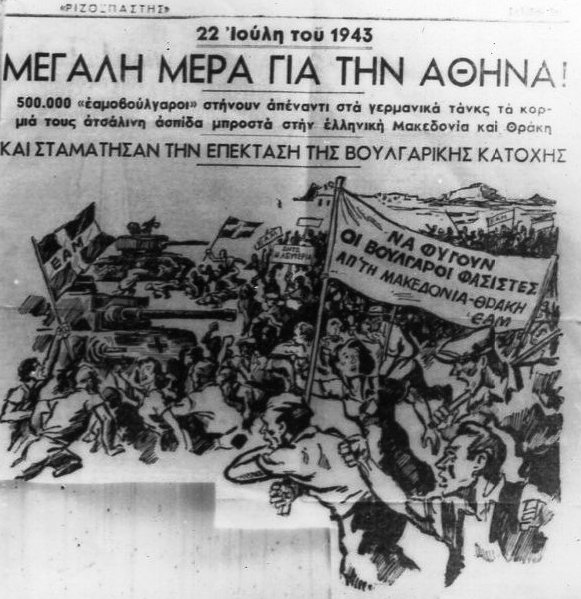
Rizospastis newspaper image for the 22 July 1943 Athens protest

== Events ==
On the night of 30 November the Security Battalions, under the supervision of Jürgen Stroop, the SS and Police Leader Greece, surrounded each of the nineteen hospitals in Athens with trucks and forcibly arrested disabled people. Many of disabled people died either during transport or in the prisons because their unhealed wounds bled as a result of the beatings by the Nazi collaborators. The disabled veterans, without their crutches or wooden prosthetic limbs, were piled into the trucks and taken to the Hatzikosta and Haidari camps. A total of 283 executions took place.
