= Viannos massacres =

1943 massacres on Crete, Greece

- Part of the war crimes of the Wehrmacht during the Cretan resistance
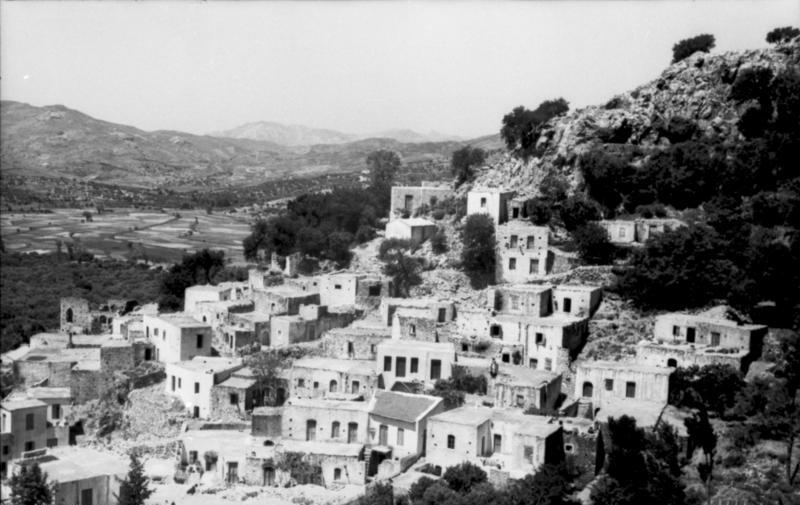
- Viannos, Heraklion, Crete, Kingdom of Greece in 1943
- Location: 35°2′49″N 25°29′22″E; Viannos, Heraklion, Crete, Kingdom of Greece (under German-occupation)
- Date: 14–16 September 1943
- Attack type: Mass execution
- Weapons: machine guns and rifles
- Deaths: 500+ Cretan men (Mass murder)
- Perpetrators: Friedrich-Wilhelm Müller; 22nd Air Landing Division
- Motive: Anti-Greek sentiment, reprisal

The Viannos massacres were a mass extermination campaign launched by German forces against the civilian residents of around 20 villages located in the areas of east Viannos and west Ierapetra provinces on the Greek island of Crete during World War II. The killings, with a death toll in excess of 500, were carried out on 14–16 September 1943 by Wehrmacht units. They were accompanied by the burning of most villages, looting, and the destruction of harvests.

The loss of life amounted to one of the deadliest massacres during the Axis occupation of Greece, second only to the massacre of Kalavryta. It was ordered by Generalleutnant Friedrich-Wilhelm Müller, in retaliation for the support and involvement of the local population in the Cretan resistance. Müller, who earned the nickname "the Butcher of Crete", was executed after the war for his part in this and other massacres.

== Background ==
Location of Viannos in Greece

Viannos is a mountainous area in the southeastern part of Heraklion regional unit, stretching between the feet of Mount Dikti in the north and the Libyan Sea in the south coast of Crete. Following the Battle of Crete in 1941 during which the island fell to the Axis, Viannos and the nearby Lasithi were part of the Italian occupation zone. Until the end of 1942, the Italians had hardly any presence in the area, hence facilitating the set up and activation of several resistance groups. Among them was one of the largest guerrilla bands in Crete, led by Manolis Bandouvas.

In early 1943, the increasing activity of guerrillas, combined with the rumors that the Allies had plans to invade Crete, led the Italians to start the construction of coastal fortifications and install garrisons in the region. On the other hand, the Germans had started since 1942 to station forces of their own in the coastal villages of Tsoutsouros and Arvi. In May 1943, they also established an outpost with three men in Kato Simi that were in charge of collecting potatoes for the provision of occupation troops and keeping the surroundings under surveillance.

=== Ambush at Kato Simi ===
The Allied invasion of Sicily in July 1943 followed by the Italian armistice announced on September 8 and the smuggling of the Italian commander of eastern Crete Angelico Carta to Egypt, reinforced the rumors that an Allied operation against Crete was imminent. Prompted by this misapprehension, Bandouvas ordered an attack against the German outpost in Kato Simi. As the English historian Antony Beevor notes, Bandouvas acted without consulting the British; he anticipated that the Allies would soon land, and hoped that he would emerge as a national hero when they did so.

The Greek writer Demosthenes Raptopoulos noted that Bandouvas and his men were constantly listening to Special Operations Executive (SOE) radio broadcasts and assumed based on these broadcasts that Allied forces would also launch an invasion of Crete; a scenario which, as Raptopoulos noted, the SOE contacts of Bandouvas refused to confirm or deny. When Bandouvas mustered a force to launch his attack, he methodically selected only members of the EAM and ELAS to participate.

On September 10, Bandouvas' partisans launched their attack on the outpost, killing the two German soldiers present and throwing their bodies in a crevice. Bandouvas later claimed he had instructed his men to capture the two alive, conforming to orders from Cairo. These claims have been denied by SOE agents Patrick Leigh Fermor and Thomas James Dunbabin, who maintain that no order was given.

=== Battle of Kato Simi ===
The bodies of the two German soldiers stationed in Kato Simi were discovered and news of the incident reached their superiors, who ordered an infantry company to move to the village and investigate their fate. In the meantime, Bandouvas had realized that the village was in danger and he was left with no other option but to defend it. Thus, he set an ambush with 40 of his men in a valley near the entrance of Kato Simi and waited for the Germans. They appeared on the morning of September 12 and were assaulted with running fire. Despite their initial surprise, the Germans managed to retreat and a fierce battle began that lasted until the late afternoon. The Germans were finally defeated, suffering heavy losses. (Note: Estimates on the number of German soldiers killed vary widely: Stroud estimates more than 400, while Davis mentions two companies.) Twelve Germans were captured alive. Bandouvas' partisans lost only one man and withdrew to the mountains.

== Massacres ==
On the day following the elimination of the company in Kato Simi, a large German force numbering more than 2,000 men started to gather in Viannos. Exasperated by the loss of his men and wanting to set an example for fleeing Italians who were considering joining with the partisans, the commander of Heraklion, Friedrich-Wilhelm Müller, ordered soldiers from the 65th Infantry Regiment of the 22nd Air Landing Division (which formed part of the German garrison) to destroy Viannos and summarily execute all males over the age of 16 as well as everyone who was arrested in the countryside, irrespective of gender or age.

Hence, a plan for the systematic destruction of Viannos was put into place starting on September 13. Separated into smaller groups, troops from the 65th Infantry Regiment surrounded the region, entering it simultaneously from various directions. At the beginning, they reassured the locals that their intentions were peaceful, persuading many of the men who had fled to the mountains to return to their homes. On the following day, indiscriminate mass executions, impromptu shootings and arrests, as well as looting, arsons, vandalism, demolition and destruction of harvests, were carried out by the Germans. Survivors were forbidden to return to their ruined homes and bury their dead.

== Aftermath ==
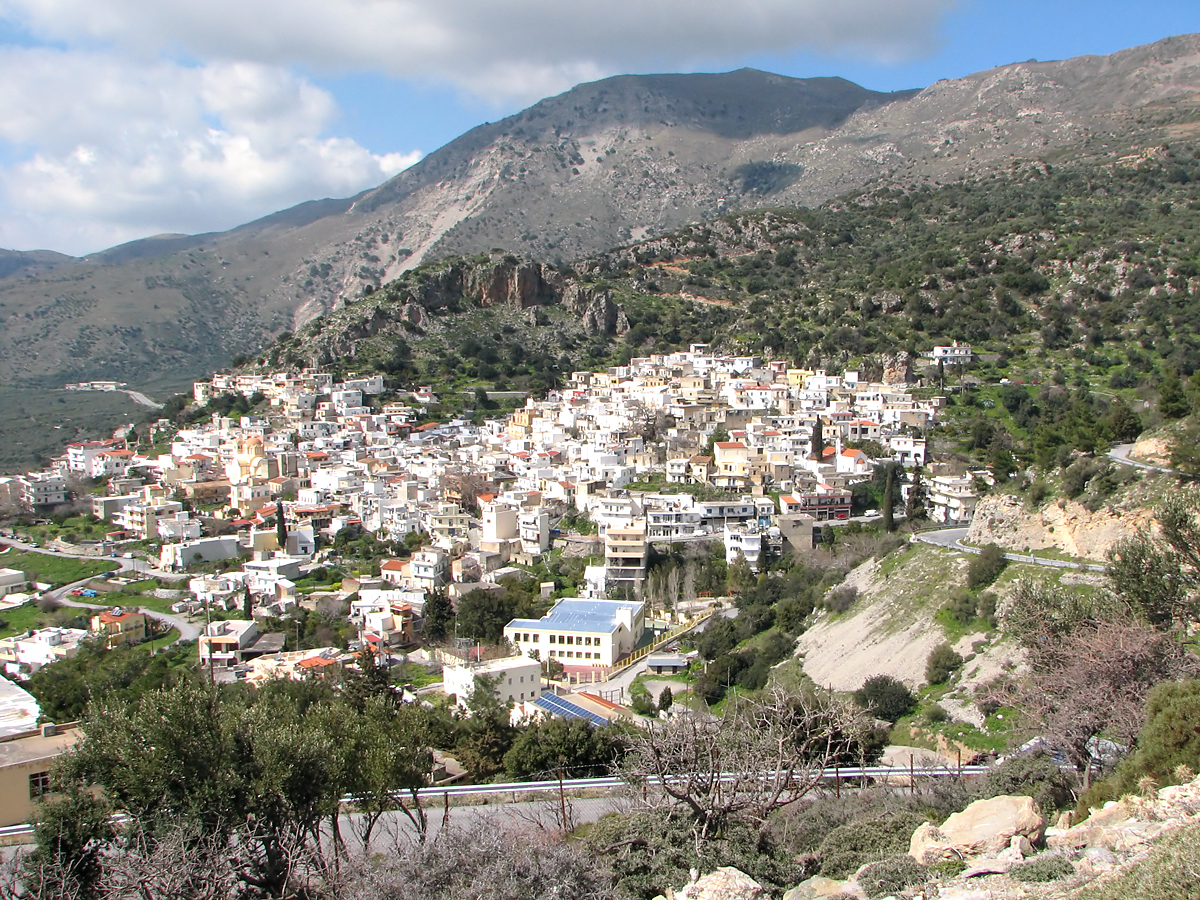
Present-day view of Ano Viannos.

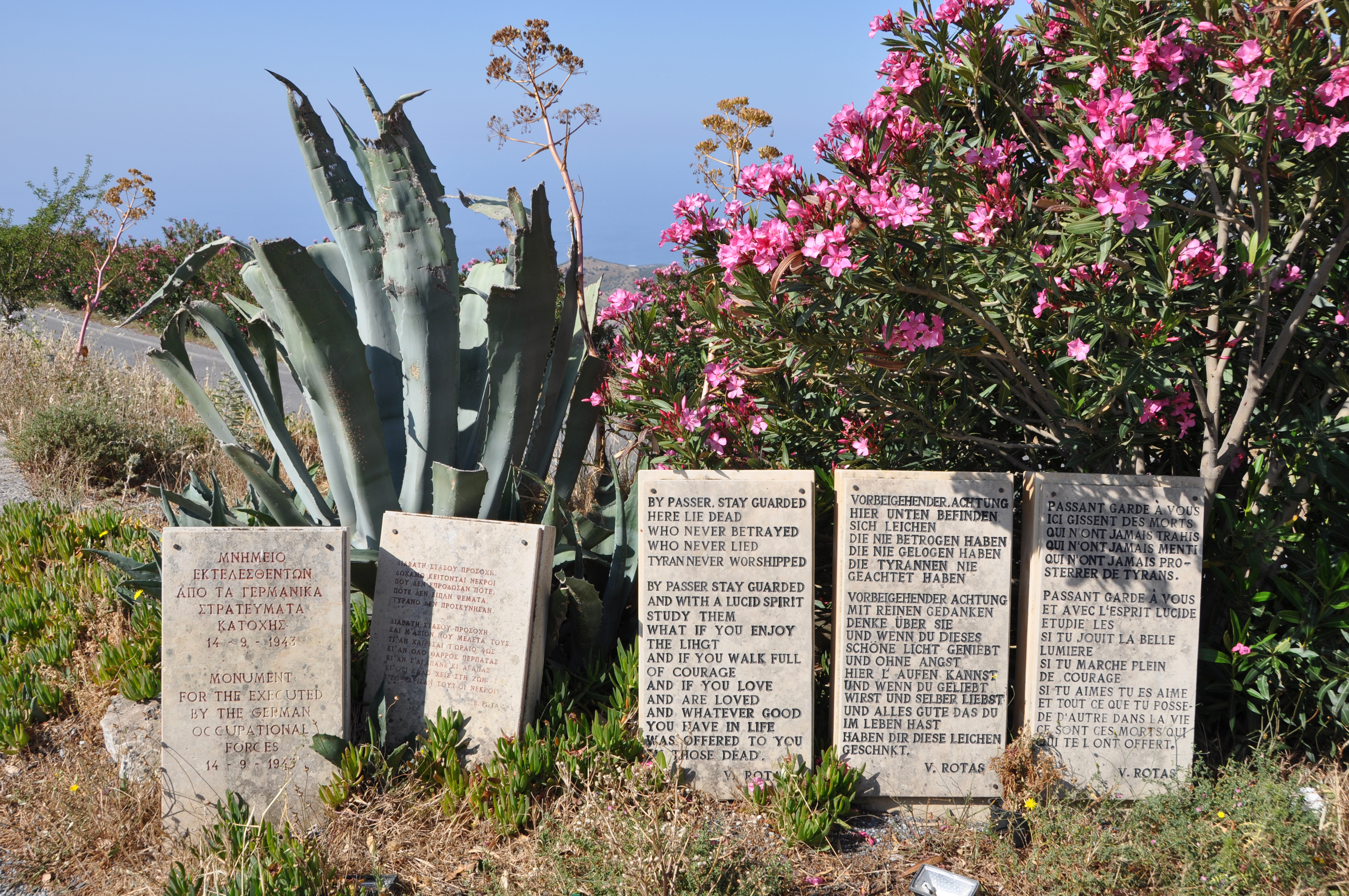
Amiras memorial – detail.

The exact number of Greek victims remains unknown but most sources agree that the number exceeds 500, consisting of inhabitants of the villages of Kefalovryssi, Kato Simi, Amiras, Pefkos, Vachos, Agios Vassilios, Ano Viannos, Sykologos, Krevatas, Kalami and Loutraki (in Greek: Κεφαλοβρύσι, Κάτω Σύμη, Αμιράς, Πεύκος, Βαχός, Άγιος Βασίλειος, Άνω Βιάννος, Συκολόγος, Κρεβατάς, Καλάμι, και Λουτράκι) in east Viannos as well as those of Myrtos, Gdochia, Riza, Mournies, Mythoi, Malles, Christos and Parsas (present day Metaxochori) (Μύρτος, Γδόχια, Ρίζα, Μουρνιές, Μύθοι, Μάλλες, Χριστός and Παρσάς – Μεταξοχώρι) in east Ierapetra.

About 200 more civilians were held hostages. Around 1,000 buildings, mostly houses, were destroyed. The surviving villagers were forbidden to bury their dead or return to their homes, most of which had been burned to the ground. No reparations were ever paid to those who survived. It took the villages many years to recover, although some never managed to achieve that completely.

Most of Bandouvas' guerrillas dispersed in the nearby mountains whilst he and a few men fled westwards, being chased by the Germans. They were joined by resistance groups of the White mountains range, and during October 1943, clashed with German detachments on several occasions. In reprisal, the Germans executed several civilians in the villages of Kali Sykia and Kallikratis. In November 1943, Bandouvas was eventually evacuated to Egypt.

General Müller was captured by the Red Army in East Prussia and later extradited to Greece. Along with Bruno Bräuer, commander of the "Festung Kreta" between 1942 and 1944, he was charged with war crimes by a Greek military court. Both were convicted, sentenced to death on 9 December 1946 and executed by firing squad on 20 May 1947. No one else was ever brought to justice.

Today, each village has a war memorial dedicated to their dead, whereas a large memorial commemorating those who lost their lives during the September 1943 has been erected in the village of Amiras, located at 35.0387°N 25.4431°E.

== See also ==
- Holocaust of Kedros
- Kallikratis executions
- List of massacres in Greece
- Massacre of Kondomari
- Razing of Anogeia
- Razing of Kandanos
- War crimes of the Wehrmacht
