= Massacre of the First Sapper Battalion =

Mass killing during the Greek Civil War

- Part of the Greek Civil War
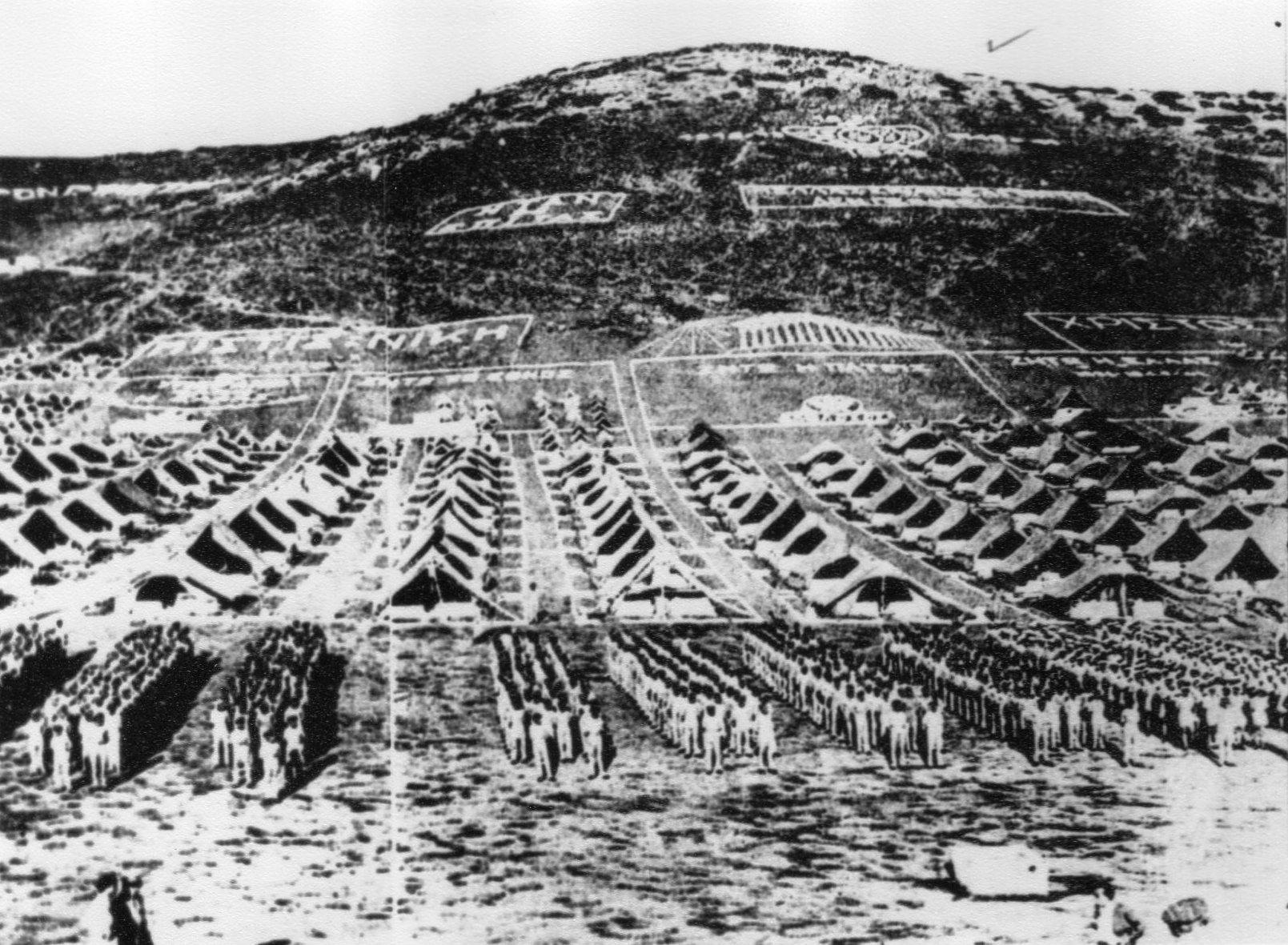
- Makronisos Prison Camp

- Location of Makronisos within Greece
- Location: Makronisos, Kingdom of Greece
- Date: 29 February – 1 March 1948
- Target: Prisoners
- Attack type: Summary executions
- Deaths: 350
- Perpetrators: Third Sapper Battalion; Prison Guards

The massacre of the First Sapper Battalion was the mass murder of 350 Greek soldiers imprisoned in the Makronisos prison island perpetrated by the camp guards and prisoner functionaries belonging to the Third Sapper Battalion. The massacre took place between 29 February and 1 March 1948, during the Greek Civil War.

== Background ==
During the Axis occupation of Greece, the EAM-ELAS resistance movement, led by the Communist Party of Greece, emerged as the dominant movement of the Greek Resistance. At the time of Greece's liberation in October 1944, EAM-ELAS dominated the country except for the major cities, especially Athens, where British forces supported the returned Greek government in exile. The rivalry between the British-backed government and EAM-ELAS resulted in the Dekemvriana clashes in Athens (December 1944 – January 1945). EAM-ELAS was defeated and had to accept its disarmament in the Treaty of Varkiza (February 1945).

With EAM-ELAS neutralized, its members became easy prey for persecution by various right-wing groups in retaliation for the preceding "Red Terror". Former ELAS partisans reacted by establishing self-defense units, with the conflict escalating into a large-scale insurgency by the end of the year.

== Makronisos ==
Following the outbreak of the civil war, the Hellenic Army sought to clear its ranks from politically unreliable personnel. Starting from the summer of 1946, former ELAS fighters and people suspected of holding leftist sympathies were transferred into three special sapper battalions (Τάγματα Σκαπανέων). On 28 May 1947, the Second Sapper Battalion was dispatched to the Makronisos military prison, it was followed by the First and Third Sapper Battalions within a span of two months, bringing the number of those imprisoned to just below 10,000.

The prison administration engaged in a systematic campaign of physical and psychological torture combined with hard labor, which was aimed at forcing the inmates into signing a letter of repentance. By doing so they would reject their former political ideals, espousing Greek nationalism and monarchism, henceforth becoming prisoner functionaries, pitting them against the unrepentant prisoners. The prison functionaries and those deemed to be the closest to full rehabilitation were transferred to the Third Sapper Battalion, which was presented as an example to be followed for the rest of the prisoners. The Second Sapper Battalion was composed of new arrivals and prisoners whose ideological alignment could not be conclusively established. The First Sapper Battalion (Α΄ Τάγμα Σκαπανέων) on the other hand was branded the "Red Battalion" as it was thought to contain exclusively "unpatriotic" elements and leftist hard-liners. In reality leftists were evenly distributed in all three battalions with those in the Third Sapper Battalion acting under duress.

== Massacre ==
On the morning of 29 February 1948, members of the First Sapper Battalion were heading towards the prison camp's auditorium for their daily roll call. At the same time the Greek Military Police began arresting heavily ill prisoners and others who were tasked with assisting the prison's cook and were therefore excused from the roll call. The military policemen began beating and insulting the detainees, to the annoyance of the rest of the prisoners who reacted by shouting "disgrace" and protesting until adjutant Kardaras ordered the policemen to cease the beatings, calming down the crowd. The battalion continued its march towards the auditorium when in a premeditated provocation prison guards opened fire upon the detainees, the latter dropped to the ground while the military policemen escorting them ran towards the barracks. The guards ceased fire upon major Karabekios' order, allowing the sappers to rise from the ground, by that time five prisoners had been killed and ten seriously injured. The battalion's commander, Antonios Vasilopoulos, arrived on the scene shortly afterwards, feigning ignorance of the prison administration's plans and promising to investigate the incident and punish those deemed responsible. The prisoners assembled in the center of the camp, placed the corpses into an empty tent, surrounded it with an honor guard and declared a symbolic hunger strike in a gesture of mourning for the victims.

On the morning of 1 March, the First Sapper Battalion was encircled by 200 soldiers belonging to the Third Sapper Battalion, while superintendent colonel Georgios Baïraktaris kept watch from a patrol boat anchored off the island's shore. The prison guards used megaphones to call the prisoners to denounce the communist provocateurs who organized the previous day's mutiny and walk to the Seventh Company's barracks where they were to sign the letter of repentance or face an all out attack by the prison functionaries. The ensuing baton charge was halted after one of the guards sounded a trumpet, this allowed the baton wielding functionaries to withdraw while the rest opened fire on the prisoners who began singing the Greek national anthem.

The Greek Ministry of Defence put the number of deaths at 21 (including 4 dead prison guards) and those injured at 61, while witnesses placed the total death toll for both days at 350. The survivors were then taken to the Seventh Company's barracks where many of them signed the repentance letter after enduring beatings. The dead were loaded into a caïque which transported them to the nearby uninhabited island of San Giorgio, they were then taken aboard a military ship which placed them inside weighted wire nets and dumped them into the sea. Between 114 and 154 prisoners were charged with inciting a revolt and tried in the Athens Special Military Court in May 1948. Five were sentenced to death, but the sentence was not carried out. Further five were sentenced to life imprisonment and 32 others received lesser sentences. The press in the government-controlled part of the country covered the events extensively and presented the massacre as a large-scale communist insurrection.

== Aftermath ==
The Makronisos prison camp's population continued to rise as the Greek Civil War drew to its end. However allegations of abuse within its confines led the moderate centrist government of Nikolaos Plastiras to transfer most prisoners and political exiles to Agios Efstratios and Trikeri. The prison camps were closed 1957 while the military jails remained operational until October 1960.

The first account of the prison's operation was published in 1966 by former detainee Nikos Margaris. In 1989, the Greek Ministry of Culture declared the island of Makronisos an historical site and all the military camp's buildings as historically protected monuments.

== Notes ==
Citations
