= Limnes =

Village in Crete

Limnes Λίμνες
- Community
- Location within Greece
- Coordinates: 35°14′49″N 25°38′17″E
- Country: Greece
- Administrative region: Crete
- Regional unit: Lasithi
- Municipality: Agios Nikolaos
- Municipal unit: Agios Nikolaos

Population (2021)
  - Community: 359
- Time zone: UTC+2 (EET)
  - Summer (DST): UTC+3 (EEST)

Limnes (Greek: Λίμνες) is a traditional Cretan small village in Lasithi, Crete, Greece, located 10 km from Agios Nikolaos. It is surrounded by olive trees and mountains.
