= 22 July 1943 Athens protest =

Protest in occupied Greece against Axis expansion in Macedonia

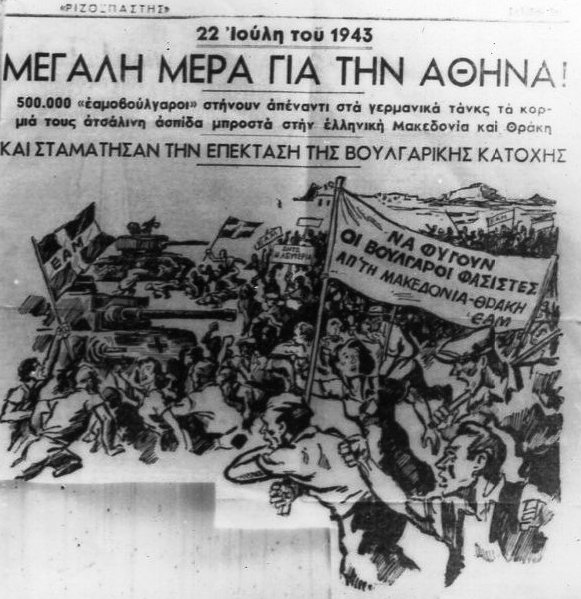
- Front page of the Communist Party's newspaper, Rizospastis, celebrating the protest
- Date: 22 July 1943
- Goals: Cancellation of the planned expansion of Bulgarian occupation in Macedonia
- Methods: Strikes, Protest, Demonstrations
- Result: Many civilians killed, the Bulgarian expansion was cancelled

Parties
(Greece) People of Athens	(Nazi Germany) German infantry troops (Kingdom of Italy) Italian cavalry (Greece) Greek collaborationist police

Lead figures
(Greece) Mikis Theodorakis (Greece) Panagiota Stathopoulou	

Casualties and losses
22 dead; over 200 wounded	

The 22 July 1943 Athens protest (Greek: Διαδήλωση της 22ας Ιουλίου 1943) was a massive protest that took place in Athens, Axis-occupied Greece on 22 July 1943 against the German plans to expand the Bulgarian occupation zone in Greek Macedonia.

== Background ==
Following the fall of Greece in April 1941, the country came under a tripartite occupation, being divided among Germany, Italy and Bulgaria. Bulgaria was given control of the islands of Thasos and Samothrace as well as a zone between the Strymon and Nestos rivers that later extended to Alexandroupolis. The Germans kept two thirds of Evros, central and western Macedonia, some islands in the Aegean, Attica and most of Crete. The remaining Greek territories were in Italian hands.

Bulgaria officially annexed the occupied territories, which had long been a target of Bulgarian irredentism, on 14 May 1941. A massive campaign of Bulgarisation was launched, which saw all Greek officials (mayors, school-teachers, judges, lawyers, priests, gendarmes) deported. A ban was placed on the use of the Greek language, and the names of towns and places changed to Bulgarian. In addition, the Bulgarian government tried to alter the ethnic composition of the region, by expropriating land and houses from Greeks in favour of Bulgarian settlers, and by the introduction of forced labour and of economic restrictions for the Greeks in an effort to force them to migrate.

== Protest and aftermath ==
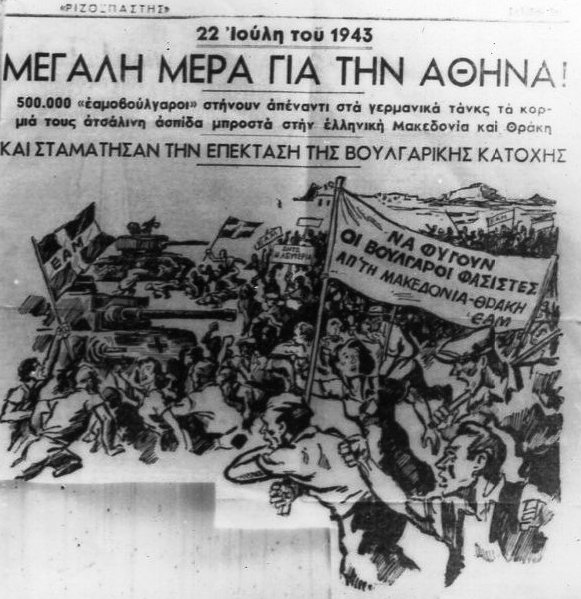
Communist Greek graphic with motive of the demonstration

During the summer of 1943, the imminent Italian exit from the war and the consequent withdrawal of Italian troops from the Balkans would force the Germans to engage more Axis troops in garrison duties replacing the Italians. Thus, early in July 1943, Adolf Hitler asked the Bulgarian government to extend its occupation zone to encompass additional territory in Serbia and Macedonia.

Upon receiving these news, Greeks became infuriated. A protest strike was called on 13 July in Athens and proved highly successful, paralyzing the city almost completely for 24 hours. Similar protests were organized in Thessaloniki and smaller cities in northern Greece. A second general strike was organized by EAM on 22 July, which rallied between 100,000 and 300,000 (or even 400,000 according to some sources) people in central Athens. A massive crowd attempted to march from Omonoia Square towards Syntagma Square along Panepistimiou Street, but came across a barricade put up by mechanized German army forces, Italian cavalry and Greek collaborationist police. The protesters were fired upon during their attempt to breach the barricade and were forced to withdraw, leaving behind 22 dead and several hundred wounded. Workers and university students participated in large numbers in the protest. Several of them were killed, being either run over by armoured vehicles or fired upon. Among them, Panagiota Stathopoulou (Greek: Παναγιώτα Σταθοπούλου) and Koula Lili (Greek: Κούλα Λίλη) are two of the most remembered today. Soon after the protest, the plans to extend the Bulgarian occupation zone were postponed indefinitely and never materialized.

== Sources ==
- Mazower, Mark (1995). Inside Hitler's Greece: The Experience of Occupation, 1941–44. Yale University Press. ISBN 0-300-08923-6.
- Sedlar, Jean W. (2007). The Axis empire in southeast Europe, 1939–1945. Booklocker.com, Inc. ISBN 978-1591136347.
