= Feneos executions =

Greek resistance reprisal killings

The Feneos Executions (alternative known as the Feneos Massacres, Σφαγές του Φενεού) is the name given to a series of killings committed by the Greek People's Liberation Army (ELAS) resistance group, and especially by its secret police (heavily controlled by the Communist Party) OPLA, in the Feneos area of Corinthia, Greece, during the first stages of the Greek Civil War, while the country was still occupied by the Axis Powers.

== History ==
In 1943 heavy fighting occurred between the partly communist-led EAM and the centrist/republican (EKKA, EDES) and right-wing/monarchist (PAO, ESEA) resistance groups. The main reason for this conflict was a series of activities of EAM, which attempted to put all other groups under its control. There were also ideology issues that created hostile sentiments. The EAM promoted the establishment of a socialist state, while the others preferred a state with free market and a multi-party parliament. The EAM also accused all other groups (without exception) for being traitorous and collaborating with the Germans. Local low-intensity clashes escalated to full civil war, with the ELAS (Greek People's Liberation Army, armed branch of EAM) attacking the other partisans who were supported by the Greek government-in-exile.

In the Peloponnese ELAS was the strongest partisan army compared to a few nationalist groups active in Elis, Messenia and Laconia. These small organisations were, sooner or later, either absorbed by ELAS or destroyed. Several thousands of nationalist partisans and their supporters were captured, along with actual collaborators of the Germans from the Security Battalions. It was common practice for ELAS and the OPLA (communist secret police) to arrest not only the opponent partisans, but their families too. In communist-controlled mountainous regions (such as districts of Achaia, Argolis and Messenia) small concentration camps were established.

One of the most notorious concentrations camps was the Monastery of Saint George, near the village of Kalivia Feneou in Corinthia. The ELAS partisans killed the 6 monks and turned the monastery cellars into a prison (March 1943). Unlike other camps, hostages did not stay for long there as after a few days they were taken to several nearby cliffs and other isolated sites, where they were executed. The executions were supervised by Vaggelis Zegos (nicknamed "Stathes" or "Triantafyllos"), representative of the Peloponesian Office of the EAM. Zegos was also in charge of all operations against anticommunists and non-communists in Argolis, Corinthia and northern Arcadia. In order to terrorise the rural populations, he used to arrest 5-10% of the inhabitants of each village. Killings in Feneos carried on until June 1944.

When ELAS was defeated by joint Greek and British troops in the December 1944 clashes in Athens, all communist organisations were disarmed (though several thousands of firearms were kept hidden and used in the "third round" of the war 1946-1949) and the newly created National Guard restored government control in most of the countryside, including Feneos.

== Rumors before civil war ==
Rumors spread by locals and right-wing newspapers claimed that ELAS had arrested and executed 5-7,000 or even 13,000 people. In fact, less than 4,000 bodies were found in the area (400 in the infamous "Hole of Feneos" and the rest in the ravine of Prophet Elias, Saint Nicolas in the White Rock, near the Hadrian aqueduct of Stymphalia etc.), out of whom 1,800 were recognised. The government built a monument, while the names of the recognised victims were written on the walls of the monastery. Ceremonies in memory are held every year with the presence of local authorities.

== Bibliography ==
- Feneos 1943-44, Yiannis Balafoutas, Athens, 1987
- 1942-1944 Civil War, The First Blood, Eustathios Georgopoulos, Periscope publishing, Athens 2010
- The Liberation of Greece and the following events, Hellenic Army General Staff/Army History Directorate, Athens, 1973
