= Friedrich Schubert =

German war criminal (1897-1947)

Fritz Schubert during the occupation

Friedrich "Fritz" Schubert (Greek: Φριτς Σούμπερτ; 21 February 1897, Dortmund – 22 October 1947, Heptapyrgion) was a Greek-speaking German NCO Oberfeldwebel (Sergeant) of the Nazi Wehrmacht. As head of the Jagdkommando Schubert, a semi-independent paramilitary force he terrorized the civilian population during the Nazi occupation of Greece in World War II and he committed numerous atrocities in Crete and Macedonia.

Tried by a special court for war criminals in Athens, he was found guilty over the killing of over 250 civilians, sentenced 27 times to death and executed.

== Early life ==
Few details of Schubert's pre-WWII life have been verified. Some Cretans believed that Schubert was born as Petros Konstantinidis (Greek: Πέτρος Κωνσταντινίδης) (the name he used when he was arrested by the Greek Police), son to a rich tobacco merchant in Smyrna and a Turkish mother and emigrated to Germany at a young age. There, he joined the National Socialist Party and became a dedicated Nazi.

However, it is verified that Schubert was German, born in Dortmund in 1897. During World War I He served in the Imperial German Army, and possibly fought in Turkey. He claimed that he was decorated with the Iron Crescent medal and he was proud of displaying it. In 1918 he possibly returned to Dortmund and became machine fitter (machinen monteur). He returned to Turkey in 1920s, where he worked for the Turkish authorities. Schubert in 1925 married an Italian woman in Smyrna and emigrated in Alexandria, Egypt where he stayed for about fifteen years. He became a member of Nazi Party in January 1934 and after the outbreak of World War II, Schubert returned to Dortmund, Germany. In April 1941 when Germany invaded Greece he joined the Ersatzheer, he was trained as a military interpreter (he already spoke Greek, Turkish, Italian and Arabic) during April and May 1941 and was promoted to Unteroffizier (corporal) in June 1941.

== As a Wehrmacht non commissioned officer ==
Detachment from Schubert's Jagdkommando in Tzermiado, ca. 1943

Schubert made his first appearance on Crete in summer 1941 as military interpreter to the Local German Command (Ortskommandatur) in Chania under general Alexander Andrae commander of occupied Crete. Possibly during August 1941 he was transferred to the Regional German Command (Kreiskommandatur) in Rethymno. In autumn 1941 Schubert was transferred again to Heraklion to the Abwehr (counter-espionage) detachment under the command of Greek speaking major Hartmann (first name unknown). As he could speak Turkish and had a strong Turkish accent when speaking Greek, Cretans nicknamed him "the Turk".

Major Hartmann organized the first armed group of pro-Nazi Cretans mainly from the Tzoulias family in the village of Krousonas. Despite the fact that Schubert took part in war crimes, there is no evidence that he was involved in the Krousonas pro-Nazi group until June 1942 when he took command. Schubert recruited several convicted Greek criminals and others pro-Nazi Cretans from Krousonas.

In April 1943 Schubert was transferred to Feldgendarmerie Local German Command 981 (Ortskommandatur) in Chania subordinate to Oberleutnant (first lieutenant) Herbert Glebin. The relations between Schubert and Hartmann became more and more strained and Hartmann ordered the imprisonment of Schubert to the Agia prison outside Chania. Schubert was released by orders of generalleutnant (lieutenant general) Bruno Braeuer commander of occupied Crete who was convicted and executed as a war criminal after the war. Bruno Braeuer gave Schubert (now an oberfeldwebel (sergeant)) complete freedom of action to suppress the resistance answering to no one. In September 1943 the Schubert group was officially established as Jagdkommando Schubert also 'National Detachment for Chasing Criminals/Communists' Greek: Εθνικό Απόσπασμα Καταδίωξης Κακοποιών/Κομμουνιστών, (ΕΑΚΚ) in eastern Crete.

The Jagdkommando Schubert was an anti-communist militia group intended to capture local resistance fighters and those who helped them. The soldiers were dressed in Italian and the officers in Wehrmacht uniforms and became known among Cretans as the Schuberai, Schubertiani or Schuberites (Greek: Σουμπεραίοι, Σουμπερτανοί, Σουμπερίτες). They were notorious for their sadistic practices during attacks against civilians that involved beating, torture, shootings and the destruction of numerous villages in Crete and Makedonia (e.g., Oropedio Lasithiou, Rodakino, Kali Sykia, Kallikratis, etc.). Even today, calling someone a Schuberitis is considered in Crete to be a serious insult synonymous to treachery and cruelty.

These events had enraged the local resistance fighters and the British agents and made them want to eliminate the Schuberai at all costs. Soon, Schubert's unit lost its effectiveness as it could not operate away from his base without the escort of a large Wehrmacht protective force. It is also possible that German officers in Crete were enraged because Schubert's practices were too cruel even for the standards of Nazi Germany. Hence, in January 1944 Schubert was ordered by Bruno Brauer to leave Crete. The men of his group were given the choice to stay in Crete or follow him to Macedonia. About half of his men were transferred to Macedonia to reinforce the collaborationist battalion of Georgios Poulos (a.k.a. Poulos Verband). While in Macedonia, Schubert's group continued their atrocities, being responsible for the massacres of Chortiatis and Giannitsa, among others.

When the German Army retreated from Macedonia in October 1944 Schubert and 70 of his men also retreated to Yugoslavia and stayed there for a few months. Schubert arrived in Vienna in February 1945 and before the Red Army captured the city he went to Schwaz in west Austria. When the US army arrived to Schwaz, Schubert and his mistress impersonated Greek displaced persons and were placed in a camp in Innsbruck awaiting transfer to Greece.

== After World War II ==
Schubert returned to Greece, either because he wanted to be with his mistress or because he had no choice. On 5 September 1945 he arrived in Eleusina military airport on board a plane repatriating ex-concentration camp prisoners back to Greece from Munich, under the false name Kostantinos Konstantinidis (Κωνσταντίνος Κωνσταντινίδης). When he was interrogated by Greek Police officers, the answers he gave were unsatisfactory and vague and he was kept in custody for further examination. When he was in custody he was recognized as Friedrich Schubert by various witnesses and prosecuted for war crimes. On 5 August 1947, he was found guilty of 271 murders and several other crimes including arson, burned numerous villages, rapes, murder of women and children in cold blood, spoils of war, and thefts. For these, Schubert was convicted 27 times to death and several thousand years of imprisonment. He was executed by firing squad in Eptapyrgio, Thessaloniki on 22 October 1947.

== See also ==
- Security Battalions
