= Sonderkommando 2000 =

World war Intelligence unit

Sonderkommando 2000 was a German counter intelligence unit established in Greece during its occupation by the Axis in WW II. It was based in Thessaloniki and aimed at infiltrating the Greek resistance movement in northern Greece.

== Sources ==
- Mark Mazower (1995). Inside Hitler's Greece: The Experience of Occupation, 1941–44. Yale University Press. ISBN 0-300-08923-6.
