= Hysiae (Argolis) =

Hysiae was an Argive garrison town in Ancient Greece

Coordinates: 37°31′11″N 22°35′09″E

Hysiae or Hysiai (Ancient Greek: Ὑσιαί), also Hysia (Ὑσία), was a garrison town of ancient Argolis, also called the Argeia, Southern Greece during the archaic period. It was located to the southwest of Argos and east of Tegea, on the road between them, at the foot of Mount Parthenium, not far from the Argive border with Laconia. In c. 669 BCE, the First Battle of Hysiae was fought between the Spartans and the Argives, who won to repulse a Spartan invasion of Argolis. It appears to have been destroyed by the Argives, along with Tiryns, Mycenae, and the other towns in the Argeia, after the Greco-Persian Wars; but it was afterwards restored, and was occupied by the Argives in the Peloponnesian War as a frontier-fortress. During the Peloponnesian War, in 417 BCE, the Second Battle of Hysiae was fought, again between the Spartans and the Argives, and resulted in a decisive Spartan victory. The Spartans captured Hysiae and destroyed it; all captured male citizens were executed.

Its site is located near modern Achladokampos.

== Sources ==
- Bury, J. B.; Meiggs, Russell (1975) [first published 1900]. A History of Greece (Fourth ed.). London: MacMillan Press. ISBN 0-333-15492-4.
- Thucydides (1972) [first published 1954]. Warner, Rex; Finley, M. I. (eds.). History of the Peloponnesian War. London: Penguin Books. ISBN 0-14-044039-9.
