= Kallikratis executions =

1943 Nazi and Greek massacre of civilians

Coordinates: 35°14′32″N 24°15′27″E

The Kallikratis executions (Greek: εκτελέσεις στον Καλλικράτη) refer to the mass execution, by German Army and Greek collaborationist paramilitary forces, of some 30 mostly male civilians of Kallikratis, in southwest Crete, on 8 October 1943. Kallikratis was declared a martyred village in October 2018.

== Background ==
During the first months of the Axis occupation of Crete, the resistance organization AEAK was headquartered at the house of Colonel Andreas Papadakis in Vourvoures (Greek: Βουρβουρές), a location between Kallikratis and Asi Gonia. Later on, the resistance operated a radio station hidden in the Anemospilios cave which is located near the Lampronas plain between Kallikratis and Asfendos. In his book The Cretan Runner, George Psychoundakis reports to have stayed in that cave during the spring of 1942 and to have been fed by Kallikratians.

== The executions ==
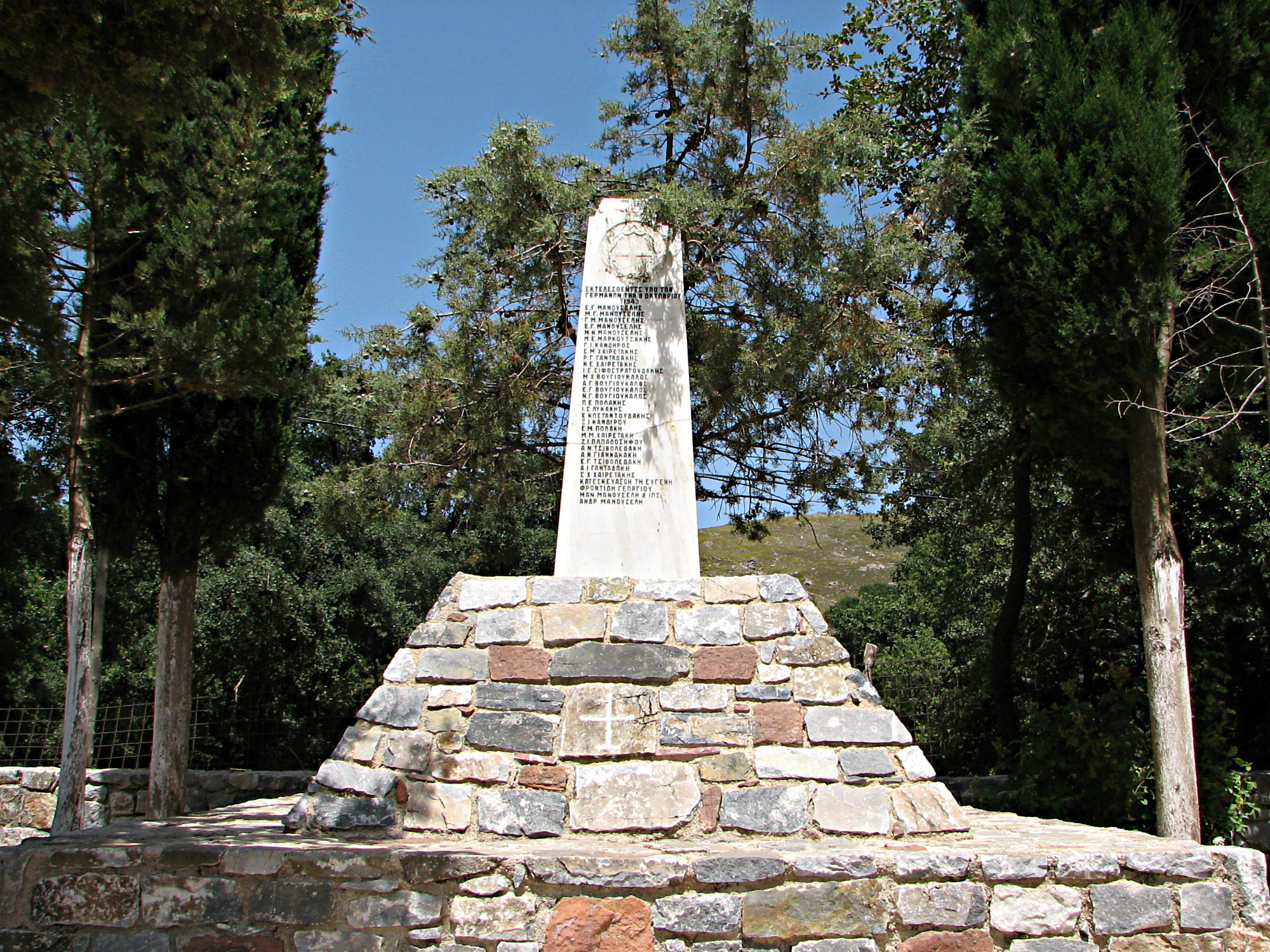
Monument of the 1943 executions.

Following the mass killings perpetrated in mid September 1943 by the German Wehrmacht at Viannos, the partisan group of Manolis Bandouvas fled westwards, being chased by the Germans. Their intention was to reach the beach of Rodakino, from where British SOE agents planned to evacuate Bandouvas to Egypt. In early October 1943, Bandouvas group was hiding in the area of Mt. Tsilivdikas (Greek: Τσιλίβδικας), located on the southern outskirts of Lefka Ori. There, they had been reinforced by two partisan groups from Kallikratis, led by Nikos Manouselis (Νίκος Μανουσέλης) and Andreas Manouselis (Ανδρέας Μανουσέλης). On October 4, 1943 the partisans clashed with and eliminated a German detachment near their hideout.

In reprisal for the locals' assistance to Bandouvas and their participation in the resistance, the German commander of Crete, Bruno Bräuer, ordered the destruction of the villages of Kali Sykia and Kallikratis. Thus, on 6 October, 1943 twelve women were burned alive in Kali Sykia. Soon after, on October 8, 1943 strong Wehrmacht forces surrounded Kallikratis after invading the plateau from different directions. The Germans were accompanied by the Jagdkommando Schubert, a paramilitary unit under the command of Sonderführer Fritz Schubert, which was intended to crush Cretan resistance by terrorizing civilians. Kallikratis' inhabitants were dragged from their homes and herded to the church, threatened with death upon disobedience. Some men were shot outside their homes under the eyes of their families, after refusing to comply with orders. Around 30 civilians were executed in total, some shot sporadically and most of them in an abandoned house in the northern neighborhood of Pipilida (Πιπιλίδα). Nevertheless, several men who had slept outside in the mountains surrounding the village as a precaution, managed to remain safe.

According to Xan Fielding, during the operation the plateau was surrounded by machine guns which directed a heavy crossfire above head level, discouraging any escape attempts. Women and children were detained and later expelled from the village, whose houses were looted and then set ablaze. About twenty women were transferred to Agia prison near Chania, where they remained detained for a month before being released.

== Aftermath ==
Schubert was executed in Thessaloniki on 22 October 1947.

A monument with the names of the victims has been erected in the neighborhood of Pano Rouga. In commemoration of the shootings, Kallikratis was declared a martyred village on 3 October 2018 (Presidential Decree 29, ΦΕΚ Α 54/2.4.2019).

== See also ==
- Viannos massacres
- Burnings of Kali Sykia
