= Burnings of Kali Sykia =

1943 atrocity by Nazi forces in Crete, Axis-occupied Greece

Coordinates: 35°14′10.5″N 24°22′53.8″E

The Burnings of Kali Sykia (Greek: Πυρπολήσεις της Καλής Συκιάς) is one of many atrocities perpetrated in Greece by Fritz Schubert and his Jagdkommando during the Nazi occupation of Greece in World War II. On October 6, 1943, 13 individuals were killed by being burned alive in the mountainous village of Kali Sykia (Καλή Συκιά), in Rethymno, Crete.

== Background ==
Crete had fallen to the Germans after a fierce, ten-day battle in May 1941. Soon after, resistance groups were formed by the Cretans and began to harass the German forces till the end of the war. In response to the resistance activities, the Germans formed the Jagdkommando Schubert, a paramilitary force led by Sdf. Fritz Schubert, whose aim was to terrorize the civilian population.

In late 1943, after the destruction of the Viannos villages, the partisan group of Manolis Bandouvas fled westwards, being chased by the Germans. In October 1943, Bandouvas and his people were hiding at Mt. Tsilivdikas (Greek: Τσιλίβδικας). They were supplied provisions by the residents of the village of Kali Sykia, which was located nearby. On October 4, 1943 Bandouvas and his group clashed with and eliminated a German detachment near their hideout.

== The burnings ==
Soon after the discovery of the dead Germans, Schubert and his people were sent to the region upon an order for punitive operations by Bruno Bräuer. On October 6, 1943, they surrounded Kali Sykia and gathered everyone they could find for questioning. Only women and children were still at the village, as the men had fled to the mountains for fear of reprisals. A few houses were set ablaze and the women were beaten and threatened with death. Despite these threats, none of the women gave any information about the whereabouts of the village men. In response to that, the Schuberai dragged several women into a few houses, locked them in and set the houses on fire, burning the women alive.

== Aftermath ==
The murders, while by no means the most numerous carried out by occupation forces in Crete, were unique in that they almost exclusively targeted women. Twelve women were burned in total, eight from the village of Kali Sykia and four from the nearby Rodakino. One of these women was eight months pregnant. Furthermore, an elderly man who could not leave his house was also burned in it. Schubert and his group moved further west and two days later took part in the execution of around 30 civilians in Kallikratis.

The only person to be brought to trial for the killings of Kali Sykia was Schubert, who was executed in Thessaloniki on October 22, 1947.

In 2017, Kali Sykia was declared a martyred village (Π.Δ. 49, 1/6/2017).

== See also ==
- Viannos massacres
- Kallikratis
