= Battle of Hysiae (417 BC) =

Battle between the armies of Argos and Sparta (417 BC)

- Part of Peloponnesian War
Date	417 BC
Location	Hysiae, Argolis
Result	Spartan victory

Belligerents
Sparta	Argos; Hysiae

Commanders and leaders
Agis II	Unknown

Casualties and losses
Low	Entire male population of Hysiae executed

The second Battle of Hysiae between the armies of Argos and Sparta took place in 417 BC during the Peloponnesian War, directly following Sparta's decisive defeat of the Argive/Athenian alliance in the Battle of Mantinea the year before.

== Battle ==
The Spartan king Agis II invaded Argive territory after a pro-Spartan faction at Argos was evicted by an Athenian force under Alcibiades, whose mission was to establish democracy there. Agis did not manage to take the city of Argos but destroyed the walls that the Argives had begun to extend towards the sea. He then captured and destroyed the town and fortress of Hysiae and had its male population executed.

The campaign is described by the historians Thucydides (5.83.2), who actually fought in the war, and Diodorus Siculus (12.81.1), who wrote in the 1st century BC, over two hundred years later. Thucydides says that the Spartans marched against Argos in the winter of 418–417 BC with all their allies, but failed to take the city of Argos. The Spartans did, however, capture and destroy the Argive town of Hysiae, taking all the male citizens as hostages. The hostages were subsequently killed.

== Aftermath ==
With Hysiae destroyed, the Spartans left a garrison in Orneae and left the territory. In response, Athens dispatched a force of 40 triremes and 1,200 hoplites who fought the Battle of Orneae to remove the garrison and take the city.

== Sources ==
- Thucydides (1972) [first published 1954]. Warner, Rex; Finley, M. I. (eds.). History of the Peloponnesian War. London: Penguin Books. ISBN 0-14-044039-9.
