= Battle of Heraklion =

World War II battle in Crete

Coordinates: 35°20′11″N 25°08′19″E

- Part of World War II, Battle of Crete
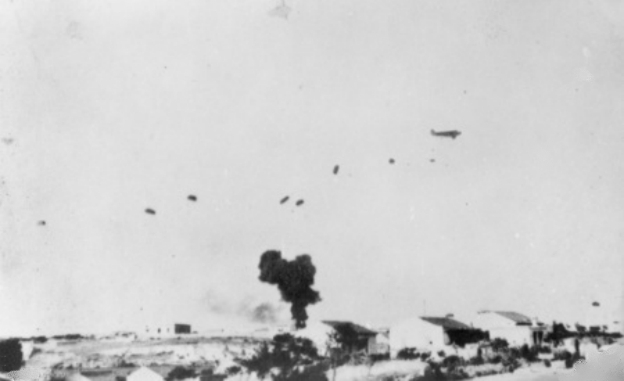
- German paratroopers dropping near Heraklion; a Ju 52 is visible and the smoke (centre) marks where another has crashed after being hit by anti-aircraft fire.
Date	20–30 May 1941
Location	Heraklion, Crete
Result	German victory

Belligerents
United Kingdom; Greece; Australia	(Nazi Germany) Germany

Commanders and leaders
(United Kingdom) Brian Chappel	(Nazi Germany) Bruno Bräuer

The location of Heraklion on a map of Crete

The Battle of Heraklion was part of the Battle of Crete, fought during World War II on the Greek island of Crete between 20 and 30 May 1941. British, Australian and Greek forces of 14th Infantry Brigade, commanded by Brigadier Brian Chappel, defended Heraklion port and airfield against a German paratrooper attack by the 1st Parachute Regiment of the 7th Air Division, commanded by Colonel Bruno Bräuer.

The attack on Heraklion during the afternoon of 20 May was one of four airborne assaults on Crete that day, following German attacks against Maleme airfield and the main port of Chania in the west of Crete in the morning. The aircraft that dropped the morning attackers were scheduled to drop the 1st Regiment over Heraklion later the same day. Confusion and delays at the airfields in mainland Greece meant that the assault was launched without direct air support, and over several hours rather than simultaneously; some units were still at the airfields by the end of the day. Those German units dropping near Heraklion suffered very high casualties, both from ground fire and upon landing. Those dropping further away were severely hampered by armed Cretan civilians. The initial German attack failed; when it was renewed the next day it failed again. The fighting then settled into a stalemate.

A battalion of the German 5th Mountain Division was supposed to reinforce the paratroopers at Heraklion by sea, bringing with it artillery and anti-aircraft guns. It was delayed en route, diverted to Maleme, then intercepted by a British naval squadron and scattered. The German overall commander, Lieutenant-general Kurt Student, concentrated all resources on the battle for Maleme airfield, which the Germans won. The Allied Commander-in-Chief Middle East, General Archibald Wavell, ordered an evacuation of Crete on 27 May and the 14th Brigade was taken off by Allied warships on the night of 28/29 May. During the return to Alexandria two destroyers were sunk, two cruisers badly damaged, more than 440 Allied servicemen killed, over 250 wounded and 165 taken prisoner. Due to their heavy losses on Crete the Germans attempted no further large-scale airborne operations during the war.

== Background ==
Greece became a belligerent in World War II when it was invaded by Italy on 28 October 1940. A British and Commonwealth expeditionary force was sent to support the Greeks; this force eventually totalled more than 60,000 men. British forces also garrisoned Crete, enabling the Greek Fifth Cretan Division to reinforce the mainland campaign. This arrangement suited the British as Crete could provide their navy with harbours on its north coast. The Italians were repulsed by the Greeks without the aid of the expeditionary force. In April 1941, six months after the failed Italian invasion, a German attack overran mainland Greece and the expeditionary force was withdrawn. By the end of April, 57,000 Allied troops were evacuated by the Royal Navy. Some were sent to Crete to bolster its garrison, though most had lost their heavy equipment.

The German army high command (Oberkommando des Heeres (OKH)) was preoccupied with the forthcoming Operation Barbarossa, the invasion of the Soviet Union and was largely opposed to an attack on Crete. Adolf Hitler was concerned about attacks on the Romanian oil fields from Crete and Luftwaffe commanders were enthusiastic about the idea of seizing Crete by an airborne attack. In Führer Directive 28 Hitler ordered that Crete was to be invaded to use it "as an airbase against Britain in the Eastern Mediterranean". The directive also stated that the operation was to take place in May and must not interfere with the planned campaign against the Soviet Union.

== Opposing forces ==
=== Allies ===
Allied dispositions and German drop zones on 20 May

On 30 April 1941 Major-general Bernard Freyberg, who had been evacuated from mainland Greece with the 2nd New Zealand Division, was appointed commander-in-chief on Crete. He noted the acute lack of heavy weapons, equipment, supplies and communication facilities. Equipment was scarce in the Mediterranean, particularly in the backwater of Crete. The British forces on Crete had seven commanders in seven months. No Royal Air Force (RAF) units were based permanently on Crete until April 1941 but airfield construction took place, radar sites were built and stores delivered. By early April airfields at Maleme and Heraklion and the landing strip at Rethymno, all on the north coast, were ready and another strip at Pediada-Kastelli was nearly finished.

Of the seven airstrips on Crete, the best equipped, and the only one with a concrete runway, was at Heraklion. It was also the only one with blast pens to protect aircraft on the ground. It was still improvised in nature, with the fuel store located outside the positions defending the airfield for example. A radar station was established on Ames Ridge, a hill south east of Heraklion airfield, but it was outside the defensive perimeter and its communications were unreliable. By 29 April 47,000 Commonwealth troops of the defeated Allied expeditionary force were evacuated from mainland Greece. In the space of a week 27,000 of these arrived on Crete from Greece, many lacking any equipment other than their personal weapons, sometimes not even those. Of these, 9,000 were further evacuated and 18,000 remained on Crete when the battle commenced. With the pre-existing garrison of 14,000 this gave the Allies a total of 32,000 Commonwealth troops to face the German attack, supplemented by 10,000 Greeks.

Heraklion was defended by the British 14th Infantry Brigade, commanded by Brigadier Brian Chappel. The brigade was made up of: the 2nd Battalion, the York and Lancaster Regiment (2nd York and Lancs; with a complement of 742 officers and men on the eve of the battle) and the 2nd Battalion, the Black Watch (Royal Highland Regiment) (2nd Black Watch; 867), with the Australian 2/4th Battalion (2/4th; 550) temporarily attached. The men of the 2/4th had been evacuated from mainland Greece to Crete, arriving on 27 April. On the night of 15/16 May, four days before the battle, the brigade was reinforced by the 2nd Battalion of the Leicester Regiment (2nd Leicesters; 637), which was transported from Alexandria to Heraklion by the cruisers HMS Gloucester and HMS Fiji. Also attached were 450 artillerymen of the 7th Medium Regiment Royal Artillery fighting as infantry and the Greek 3rd and 7th regiments (both battalion-sized and lacking training and weaponry) and a Greek depot battalion undergoing training. Supporting the brigade was the 234 Battery of the 68 Medium Regiment of artillery, which was equipped with 13 captured Italian field guns. Also attached to the brigade were the 7th Battery of the 2/3rd Light Anti-Aircraft Regiment, five heavy infantry tanks and six light tanks – not all necessarily operational at a given time – and a variety of other small anti-aircraft, support and ancillary units. As well as the Italian guns the brigade could field a further two artillery pieces and 14 anti-aircraft guns of several calibres. In total Heraklion was defended by just over 7,000 men, of whom approximately 2,700 were Greek. (Note: This excludes approximately 340 men of the Argyll and Sutherland Highlanders who reinforced the garrison from 25 May.)

=== Germans ===
The German assault on Crete was code-named "Operation Mercury" (Unternehmen Merkur) and was controlled by the 12th Army commanded by Field Marshal Wilhelm List. The German 8th Air Corps (VIII Fliegerkorps) provided close air support; it was equipped with 570 combat aircraft. The infantry available for the assault were the German 7th Air Division, with the Air-landing Assault Regiment (Luftlande-Sturm-Regiment) attached, and the 5th Mountain Division. They totalled 22,000 men grouped under the 11th Air Corps (XI Fliegerkorps) which was commanded by Lieutenant-general Kurt Student who was in operational control of the attack. Over 500 Junkers Ju 52 transport aircraft were assembled to carry them. Student planned a series of four parachute assaults against Allied facilities on the north coast of Crete by the 7th Air Division, which would then be reinforced by the 5th Mountain Division, part transported by air and part by sea; the latter would also ferry much of the heavy equipment.

For the assault on Heraklion the Germans assigned their strongest individual force of those launching the initial assault on Crete: the 1st Parachute Regiment, the 2nd Battalion of the 2nd Parachute Regiment and an anti-aircraft machinegun battalion, all from the 7th Air Division. This force totalled approximately 3,000 men and was commanded by Colonel Bruno Bräuer. A few days before the attack, German intelligence summaries stated that the total Allied force on Crete consisted of 5,000 men and that the garrison of Heraklion was 400 strong. Before the invasion, the Germans conducted a bombing campaign against Crete and the surrounding waters to establish air superiority. The RAF rebased its surviving aircraft to Alexandria after 29 of their 35 Crete-based fighters were destroyed.

==== Paratroopers ====
The design of the German parachutes and the mechanism for opening them imposed operational constraints on the paratroopers. The static lines, which automatically opened the parachutes as the men jumped from the aircraft, were easily fouled and so each man wore a coverall over all of their webbing and equipment. This precluded their jumping with any weapon larger than a pistol or a grenade. Rifles, automatic weapons, mortars, ammunition, food and water were dropped in separate containers. Until and unless the paratroopers reached these they had only their pistols and hand grenades with which to defend themselves.

The danger of fouling the static lines also required that German paratroopers leapt headfirst from their aircraft and so they were trained to land on all fours – rather than the usually recommended feet together, knees-bent posture – which resulted in a high incidence of wrist injuries. Once out of the plane German paratroopers were unable to control their fall or to influence where they landed. Given the importance of landing close to one of the weapons containers, doctrine required jumps to take place from no higher than 400 feet (120 m) and in winds no stronger than 14 miles per hour (23 km/h). The transport aircraft had to fly straight, low and slowly, making them an easy target for any ground fire. Paratroopers were carried by the reliable tri-motored Ju 52. Each aircraft could lift 13 paratroopers, with their weapons containers carried on the planes' external bomb racks.

== Opposing plans ==
Map of the German assault on Crete; Heraklion is to the right.

=== Allied defences ===
Chappel deployed the three Greek units in Heraklion and the open ground to the town's west and south. The town was protected by its early modern walls. Running east from the town Chappel deployed in turn the 2nd York and Lancs, the 2nd Leicesters and the 2/4th. The 2/4th was deployed to overlook the airfield from two hills, known as "the Charlies". To their east, closing the gap between the Charlies and the sea were the 2nd Black Watch; within their perimeter was East Hill, from which they could dominate both the coast road and the airfield itself, which lay some 3 miles (5 km) from the centre of Heraklion. The field guns and the artillerymen fighting as infantry were positioned to the east of Heraklion, behind the front-line battalions. Ten Bofors anti-aircraft guns were positioned around the airfield. All units were well dug in and camouflaged.

=== German assault ===
The overall German plan for their assault on Crete was to land two reinforced German regiments by parachute and assault glider at Maleme airfield and near the main port of Chania in the west of Crete the morning of 20 May. The aircraft which dropped them were scheduled to then make further drops at Rethymno and Heraklion in the afternoon.

Bräuer, anticipating opposition from half a battalion, rather than seven, planned for the 2nd Battalion of the 1st Parachute Regiment (II/1), reinforced by an anti-aircraft machinegun company, to land in two groups on or near the airfield and capture it. The regiment's 3rd Battalion (III/1) would land in the open areas south west of Heraklion, rapidly concentrate and take the town by a coup de main. The 2nd Battalion of the 3rd Parachute Regiment (II/3) would land immediately to the west of the III/1. Bräuer would drop with the 1st Battalion (I/1) 5 miles (8 km) to the east as an operational reserve. After capturing the airfield and town Bräuer intended to move his regiment west towards the Germans landing 80 kilometres (50 mi) away at Rethymno, while deploying a scouting screen eastwards.

== Battle ==
=== Initial assault ===
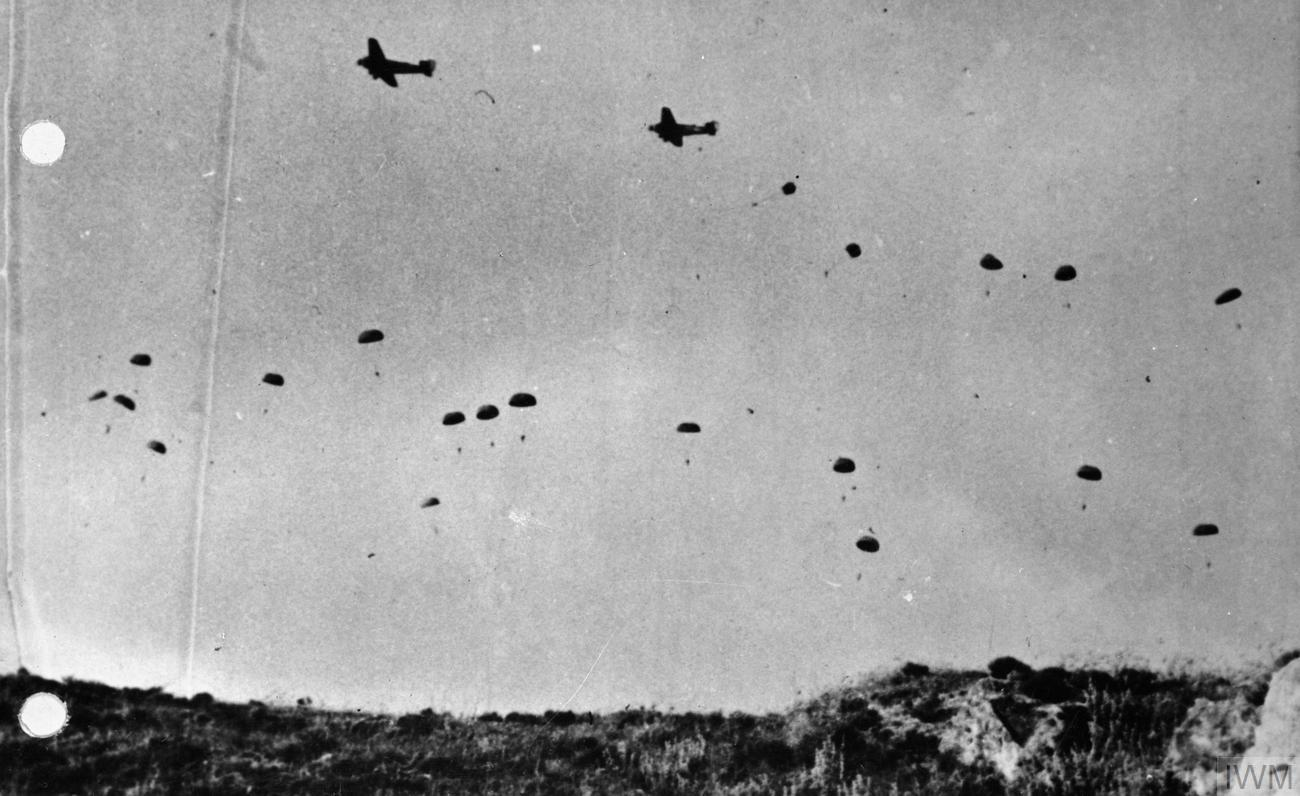
German paratroopers dropped over Crete

On the morning of 20 May the attacks on Maleme airfield and Chania took place as scheduled. The transport aircraft involved in them returned to mainland Greece to embark the paratroopers scheduled to drop at Rethymno and Heraklion in the afternoon. The Germans were having problems with their hastily constructed airfield facilities which had consequences for the attack on Heraklion. They were blanketed with dust clouds blown up by the aircraft's engines, reducing safe taxiing speeds and making taking off and landing hazardous. Several Ju 52s which had been damaged by Allied ground fire crashed on landing and had to be towed clear of the runways. Refueling was carried out by hand and took longer than anticipated. Aware that this would mean a significant delay to when the drop around Heraklion would commence, the commander of the Ju 52 wing, Rüdiger von Heyking, attempted to have the air support attack similarly delayed. Inadequate communication systems prevented this message from getting through in time.

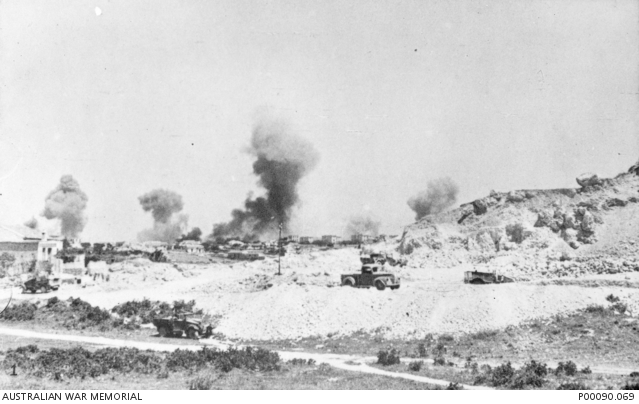
Columns of smoke rise after an aerial bombing of Heraklion by the Luftwaffe.

The assault on Heraklion began with a strong German air attack at about 16:00. This was intended to prevent Allied ground fire against the vulnerable Ju 52s. Both the infantry and the anti-aircraft guns were under orders not to return fire, so the attackers were unable to identify their positions and there were few casualties among the well dug in and camouflaged Allies. The German attack was also intended to provide close air support for the paratrooper drop. In the event the attacking bombers and fighters ran low on fuel and departed before the paratrooper transports arrived. Due to a failure of wireless communications, the 14th Brigade was unaware of the airborne assault in western Crete that morning and did not associate the unusually heavy air raid with the possibility of a parachute attack. At around 17:30 the Ju 52s, paralleling the coast, commenced their drop runs. Flying straight and low they were easy targets for the limited number of Allied anti-aircraft guns. Even the Allied infantry were able to engage them. The Australians on the Charlies reported being able to fire directly into aircraft doors as the paratroopers were jumping. Many paratroopers were killed in the air as they slowly descended. The II/1 Battalion was dropped close to the airfield; its men who reached the ground alive were attacked by infantry of the Black Watch supported by tanks before being able to reach their weapons containers. A few attempted an assault on East Hill, but were easily repulsed. Within thirty minutes the battalion lost 400 dead and wounded, the survivors consolidating near Ames Ridge, south east of the Allied positions, or in an abandoned barracks on the coast road to the east.

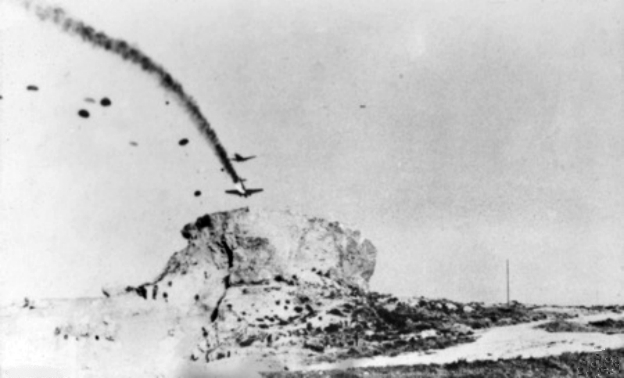
A group of German paratroopers exiting a Junkers Ju 52 transport aircraft near Heraklion during the German assault. A second Ju 52 is burning and trailing smoke after being hit by Allied ground fire.

West of Heraklion the III/1 Battalion also suffered badly from the Allied anti-aircraft fire. Greek troops and armed civilians immediately counter-attacked the Germans on the ground. As the Cretans exhausted their ammunition the Germans attacked the town. The old walls obstructed their advance as they lacked heavy artillery or explosives with which to breach them. They concentrated on the town gates and were able to fight their way into the town in two groups, and house-to-house fighting ensued which continued late into the night. The German battalion commander, Major Karl-Lothar Schulz, attempted to regroup in the southern part of the town but was unable to recall all of those fighting in the narrow streets. Some groups got as far as the harbour. Schulz withdrew from the town with those troops he could gather.

The II/2 Battalion landed uneventfully further west, but it was at half strength; the balance of the battalion was still in mainland Greece, trapped in the chaos at the airfields. Next morning the missing troops were diverted by Student to Maleme Airfield, 100 miles (160 km) to the west. The half-battalion which had dropped took up a position to block the coast road to Heraklion from the west.

The I/1 Battalion landed successfully 5 miles (8 km) east of Heraklion at around 20:00 and captured a radio station near the village of Gournes. Bräuer landed with this unit and, although he was unable to make contact with his other battalions, reported that the attack was progressing "as smooth as silk". He then took one platoon from the battalion and marched west with it and the regimental headquarters section. Nearing the town he discovered that the II/1 had been all but wiped out and that the airfield was still strongly held by the Allies. A little after midnight he passed this update on to mainland Greece and launched his solitary platoon in an attack on East Hill. Facing the dug in Black Watch battalion this failed and the platoon was cut off from Bräuer. The rest of the battalion was unable to move up in time to reinforce the attack as it was delayed by having to assemble itself and retrieve its weapons containers in the dark and by attacks from Cretan civilians. These attacks were responsible for the elimination of an entire platoon, and caused approximately 200 casualties in total.

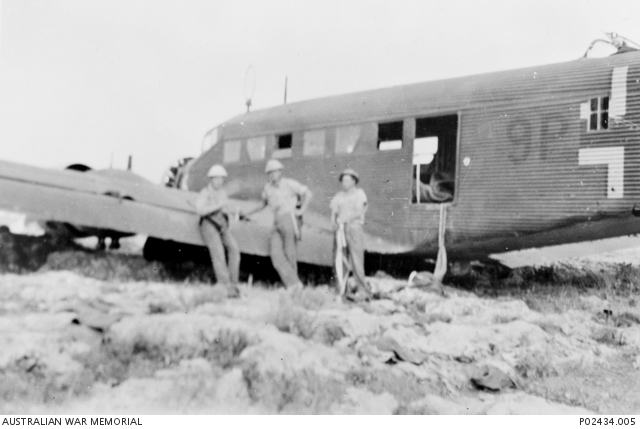
Junkers Ju 52 transport aircraft downed by anti-aircraft fire from 2/4 Battalion.

Because of the disorder at the Greek airfields the German air operations over Heraklion were ill coordinated. The paratrooper drop continued for two to three hours, providing a succession of easy targets for Allied anti-aircraft guns. During this period no German fighters nor bombers returned to suppress the ground fire. A total of 15 Ju 52s were shot down. Before the Germans had completed their drop Chappel had already committed his reserve battalion and tanks to a counter-attack. On receipt of the initial report from Bräuer, Student gave orders for the 5th Mountain Division to be ferried by air to Heraklion airfield on the 21st. When Bräuer's subsequent report was received, Student realised that all four paratrooper assaults had failed. Determined, in the words of the historian Callum MacDonald, "to snatch victory from the jaws of defeat" he ordered that all resources be reallocated to capturing the airfield at Maleme, 100 miles (160 km) west of Heraklion.

=== Seaborne contingent ===
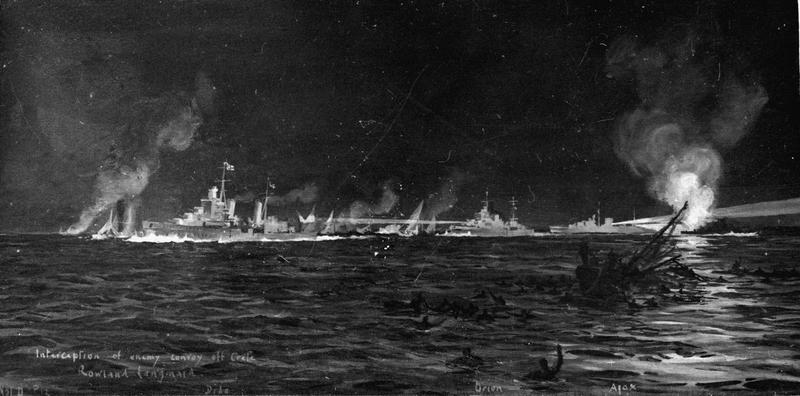
Painting of the British cruisers intercepting part of the German convoy to the north of Crete on the night of 21/22 May

Meanwhile, the 2nd Battalion of the 85th Mountain Regiment (II/85) from the 5th Mountain Division and much of the division's artillery and anti-aircraft guns had loaded onto commandeered Greek caiques at Piraeus, the port of Athens, and sailed to Milos escorted by the Italian torpedo boat Sagittario. This convoy was known as the 2nd Motor Sailing Flotilla. Alongside them was the 1st Motor Sailing Flotilla, bound for Maleme. The two flotillas totalled 70 small vessels. The plan was for both to sail for Milos, then cross from Milos to Crete while a strong escort of aircraft deterred the British navy from attacking. They were detected by Allied signal intelligence and their position confirmed by aerial observation. At nightfall on 20 May an Allied naval squadron known as Force C and consisting of two cruisers, HMAS Perth and HMS Naiad, and four destroyers, commanded by Rear Admiral Edward King, entered the Aegean via the Strait of Kasos to the east of Crete. They sailed to intercept the force believed to be heading towards Heraklion and were attacked by Italian aircraft and light ships at dusk. They found no invasion force between Milos and Heraklion, patrolled off Heraklion until dawn and then returned to the Mediterranean. En route they were attacked by German dive bombers but suffered no losses.

Wary of the Allied naval patrols, the German convoys had spent the night in the vicinity of Milos. At first light on the 21st they headed south. Student had asked Admiral Karlgeorg Schuster to divert the Heraklion-bound convoy to Maleme, in keeping with his new concentration on the latter. The caiques moved at around 6 knots (10 km/h; 7 mph) and the impressed Greek crews were suspected of not getting the best out of their vessels. At 10:00 the convoy was ordered back to Milos due to inaccurate reports of Allied ships in the area; this order was subsequently cancelled, reinstated and cancelled again. Aware of the convoy's progress due to Ultra signals intercepts the Allies sent a squadron through the Kythira Strait to the west of Crete. This was Force D, consisting of the cruisers HMS Ajax, HMS Orion and HMS Dido, and three destroyers commanded by Rear Admiral Irvine Glennie. They were unsuccessfully dive bombed as they entered the Aegean and intercepted the 1st Motor Sailing Flotilla at about 22:30. The British squadron attacked the head of the by now scattered convoy, harried by the Italian torpedo boat Lupo, which was hit repeatedly and driven off. Believing that they had destroyed the convoy, the British ships withdrew. In fact many caiques escaped in the confusion. A total of 297 German soldiers from a force of 2,000 were killed. The diminished II/85 was later airlifted into Crete and by the evening of 23 May they were fighting against the New Zealand 5 Brigade at Galatas.

Reports of this setback caused the recall of the 2nd Motor Sailing Flotilla, but these orders did not reach it until 09:30 on the 22nd. Meanwhile, Force C, reinforced by the anti-aircraft cruiser HMS Carlisle, had re-entered the Aegean the previous night to patrol off Heraklion. Not finding any shipping the squadron searched to the west and intercepted the main escort of the 2nd Motor Sailing Flotilla, the Italian torpedo boat Sagittario, at 10:10 and approximately 25 miles (40 km) off Milos. Eventually, the 2nd Motor Sailing Flotilla and its escort managed to slip away undamaged. King's warships, despite their failure to destroy the German troop transports, had succeeded in forcing the Axis to abort the landing by their mere presence at sea. King, knowing that his ships were low on anti-aircraft ammunition and feeling that he had achieved his main objective, ordered Force C to withdraw. As it headed south Naiad was badly damaged and Carlisle set on fire by German bombers. Admiral Cunningham later criticised King, saying that the safest place during the air attack was amongst the flotilla of caïques.

=== Second day and onwards ===
During the night of 20/21 May many of the Germans who had landed around Heraklion suffered greatly from thirst. Isolated or in small groups, many of them wounded, they were hunted by Allied fighting patrols and Cretan civilians and often pinned down by Allied fire; some contracted dysentery from drinking stagnant water. On the morning of the 21st Bräuer again attacked East Hill, hoping to both relieve the platoon which had been cut off on the hill the previous evening and gain a position overlooking the airfield. The assaults were ill-coordinated and failed with heavy loss; the isolated platoon was overrun at around 12:00. German air attacks were renewed, but the Allies duplicated the German recognition signals, which confused the attackers. Where these ruses were seen through, the bombing was again ineffective against the well dug in Allies.

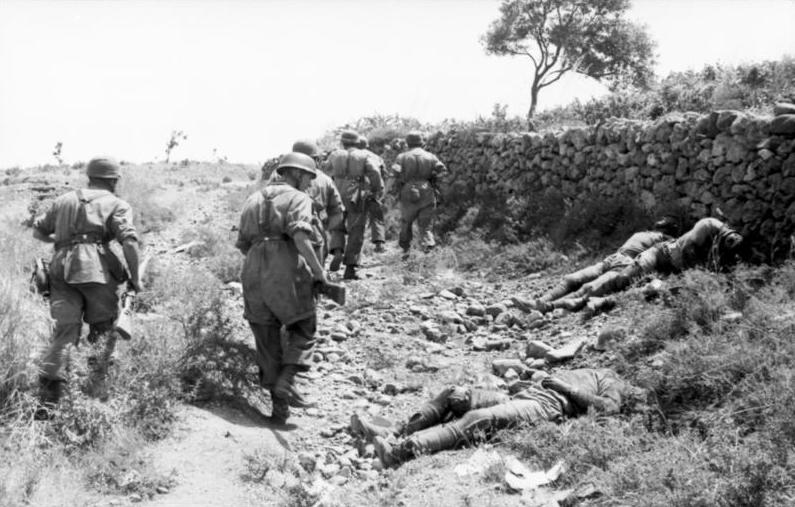
Paratrooper patrol

Schulz, to the west of Heraklion, was out of contact with Bräuer, but could hear heavy firing from the east and when he learnt that the 8th Air Corps was to bomb Heraklion at 10:00 he determined to attempt to capture the town again. He requested reinforcements from the II/2 Battalion, but this unit had heard that its missing components had been diverted to Maleme and, facing large bands of armed Cretan civilians, only sent one platoon. After Heraklion was heavily bombed the III/1 Battalion attacked the shaken Greeks via the South and West Gates, broke into the town and relieved some of the paratroopers isolated the previous evening. The Greeks ran very short of ammunition. The Germans again fought their way as far as the harbour and the Greeks negotiated a surrender of the town. Before this could be put into effect Chappel sent reinforcements which threatened the German flanks and forced them to withdraw. He also sent large quantities of captured German weapons and ammunition. On 22 May, the 3rd Regiment and armed Greek civilians cleared the western and southern approaches of Heraklion and the Black Watch also cleared the eastern approaches of the airfield. Following reports that the Germans were using civilians as human shields, the Greek military governor of Heraklion, Major-general Michail Linardakis, sent an emissary to demand that this cease, threatening to retaliate against German prisoners of war. Schulz agreed on condition that Heraklion surrender within two hours, which Linardakis refused.

When Ju 52s flew over the Allies ceased fire and displayed captured panels requesting resupply; the confused German pilots dropped large quantities of weapons, ammunition and equipment, including two motorcycles with sidecars, into the Allied positions. Much of the German weaponry was distributed to the local Cretans. On 23 May six Hurricanes from No. 73 Squadron RAF were sent to Heraklion from Egypt, but several suffered landing damage and the facility lacked adequate fuel and ammunition for them and they were withdrawn the next day. On the 24th four companies of paratroopers were dropped west of Heraklion to reinforce the Germans and the town was heavily bombed in retaliation for its non-surrender on the 21st and again on the 23rd; according to MacDonald it was reduced to rubble. On the night of 24/25 May the Greek units were withdrawn to the area of Knossos for rest and refitting and the defence of Heraklion was taken over by Commonwealth units. The 1st Battalion of the Argyll and Sutherland Highlanders (Argylls), 655 men strong, had landed at Tympaki on the south coast of Crete on 19 May; advance elements of it reached Heraklion on 25 May and eventually approximately 340 men of the battalion reinforced the 14th Brigade.

Middle East Command and the Allied HQ on Crete's plan was that when the Argylls arrived at Heraklion, one of 14th Brigade's existing battalions would move westwards to Rythymno. Chappel, believing the German force to be stronger than it was, was content for the brigade to hold its positions, although several tanks and some artillery pieces were sent by sea to the more active fighting in the Maleme area. Chappel was in radio contact with GHQ Middle East in Cairo, but not with Freyberg, his immediate superior. On the night of 26/27 May he queried Freyberg through Cairo as to whether he should attempt to clear the routes to the west and south. The historian Antony Beevor believes that this would have been impractical due to the state of the roads and German opposition. By the time the query was sent the battle on Crete had already been lost. Meanwhile, the Germans were under constant pressure from the Cretans, despite fierce German reprisals. They were further reinforced by paratroopers landing at Gournes on the 27th.

== Allied evacuation and Greek surrender ==
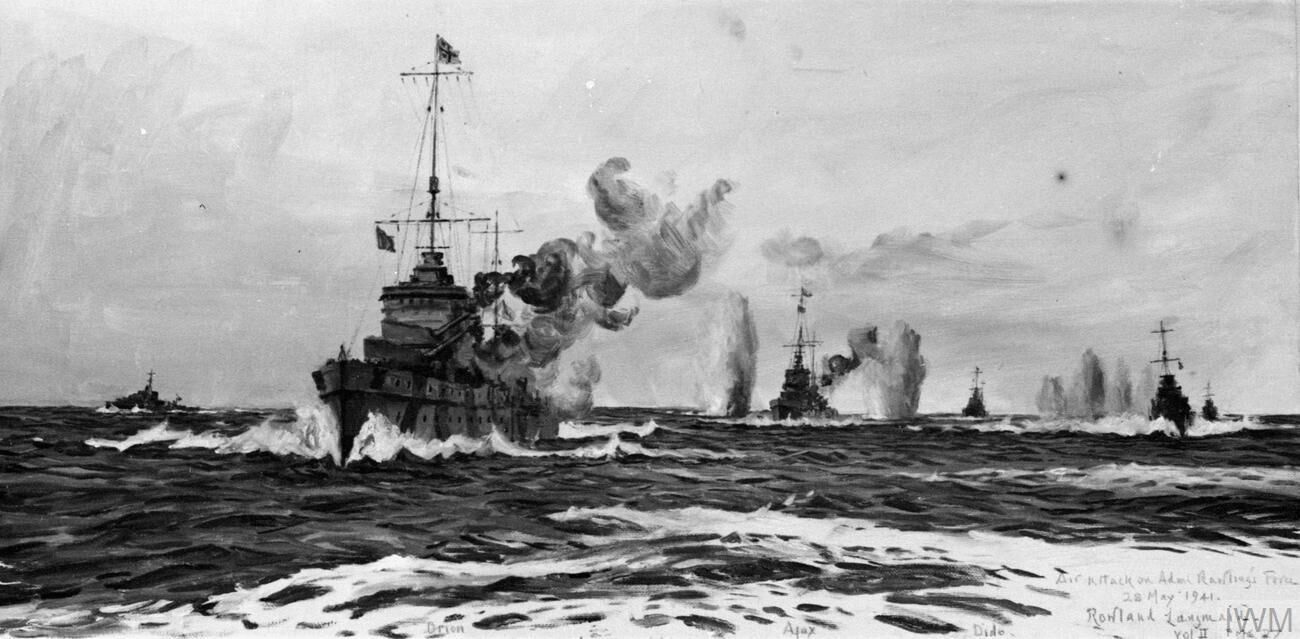
Painting of Rear Admiral Rawling's force under attack on 28 May

Meanwhile, the Germans had succeeded in securing Maleme airfield, captured the port town of Chania and pushed the Allies there east and south. On 26 May Freyberg informed General Archibald Wavell, Commander-in-Chief Middle East, that the Battle of Crete was lost. The next day Wavell ordered an evacuation and that evening 14th Brigade was informed that they would be evacuated by sea on the night of 28/29 May, ships arriving at midnight and departing by 03:00. Shortly before noon on 28 May a further 2,000 paratroopers landed to the east of the brigade's position and late that afternoon the Allies were heavily bombed for two hours. During the day, stores, equipment and heavy weapons were destroyed. The naval evacuation force consisted of three cruisers – Orion, Ajax and Dido – and six destroyers – Hotspur, Jackal, Decoy, Hereward, Kimberley and Imperial – and was commanded by Rawlings. Before reaching Heraklion Ajax suffered a near miss from a bomb, which started a fire on the ship; Rawlings ordered her back to Alexandria. The embarkation went smoothly and the squadron was underway by 03:00 with approximately 4,000–4,100 evacuees on board. Many wounded and some detachments guarding road blocks were left behind. To maintain security, the Greeks had not been told of the planned evacuation of the Commonwealth forces and only one Greek soldier was evacuated.

The Imperial's steering gear broke down at about 03:45 and her crew and complement of soldiers had to be taken off at sea, at night, and she was then sunk. This delayed the squadron and they were 90 minutes behind schedule by 06:00, when they were sighted by Luftwaffe reconnaissance planes. Over the following nine hours 400 separate attacks by Junkers Ju 87 dive bombers (Stukas) were counted. The planes were based at Scarpanto, less than 90 miles (140 km) away. At 06:25, Hereward was hit and began sinking. The order to abandon ship was given and six hours later Italian MAS boats rescued 165 crew and about 400 soldiers. Fatalities are estimated at 63 crew and about 50 soldiers. Dido and Orion were both hit repeatedly by the dive bombers, causing heavy casualties. One hit blew Orion's forward turret overboard and temporarily set fire to the ship. There were also high level bombing attacks, although no hits are recorded from them. Allied fighters covered the final part of the journey, and Alexandria was reached at 20:00. Some ships had all but exhausted both their fuel and their ammunition.

The Germans occupied Heraklion on 30 May. Linardakis signed an instrument of surrender there with Bräuer and the Greek troops in the area laid down their weapons. They were taken to Maleme and Chania, but they were gradually released over the following six months.

== Aftermath ==
During the fighting around the town and the subsequent evacuation the Commonwealth troops of the 14th Brigade suffered 195 killed on Crete, 224 are known to have died during the evacuation or of wounds in Egypt. An unknown, but assumed to be small, number were too intoxicated to disembark from the Imperial and were lost when she sank. An unknown number died due to the sinking of the Hereward. An unknown number of wounded men were left on Crete and 244 wounded who subsequently survived were landed in Alexandria. An unknown number of men were taken prisoner during the fighting or captured as a result of not being evacuated, including more than 300 men of the Argylls who were still making their way from the south coast, and approximately 400 were captured as a result of the sinking of Hereward, some of whom may also have been wounded. Over 200 naval personnel were killed and 165 taken prisoner, the latter all from the Hereward. The number of Greeks killed and wounded is not known.

German losses during the battle are uncertain. They have been reported by British and Australian historians as "over 1,000 killed" on 20 May and at least 1,250 or 1,300 dead by the 22nd. Daniel Davin, in the New Zealand Official History, warns "reports of German casualties in British reports are in almost all cases exaggerated". German records do not show losses at regimental level, so their actual casualties cannot be accurately assessed. They launched four regimental assaults against Crete on the 20th, of which the attack on Heraklion was one; total German paratrooper losses throughout the campaign on Crete have been variously assessed as up to 3,022 killed and approximately 1,500 wounded in the British Official History, up to 2,818 killed and 1,505 wounded in a 2002 study for the US Army, or 3,077 killed, 2,046 wounded and up to 17 captured in the New Zealand Official History. Crete fell to the Germans, but they suffered more casualties than during the entire campaign in the Balkans until then. Almost 200 Ju 52s were put out of action. Due to their heavy losses on Crete the Germans attempted no further large-scale airborne operations during the war.

The German occupation of Crete was brutal, with 3,474 Cretan civilians being executed by firing squad and many more killed in reprisals and atrocities. Bräuer was the German commander on Crete from November 1942 to July 1944. When the war ended in May 1945 the commander of the German garrison signed the capitulation of Crete in Heraklion. After the war, Bräuer was charged with war crimes by a Greek military court. He was convicted and subsequently hanged on 20 May 1947, the sixth anniversary of the German invasion of Crete.

After its capture by the Germans, Heraklion airfield was used to transport supplies and reinforcements to Axis forces operating in North Africa in 1941 and 1942. It was successfully raided in June 1942 by Allied special forces. Since the war it has been developed as an international airport and is the second busiest in Greece, with 7 million passenger movements in 2018.

== Notes, references and sources ==
=== Sources ===
- (2/4th Infantry Battalion Unit History Editorial Committee) (1963). White Over Green: The 2/4th Battalion and Reference to the 4th Battalion. Sydney, New South Wales: Angus and Robertson. OCLC 19985329.
- Admiralty Historical Section (2002). The Royal Navy and the Mediterranean: November 1940 – December 1941. Whitehall Histories. Vol. II. London: Whitehall History in association with Frank Cass. ISBN 978-0-7146-5205-4.
- Antil, Peter D. (2005). Crete 1941: Germany's Lightning Airborne Assault. Oxford: Osprey. ISBN 978-1-84176-844-1.
- Atwill, R. (2020) [1971]. "Orion into the Breach". Naval Historical Society of Australia. Archived from the original on 6 December 2020.
- "Australian War Memorial". Australian War Memorial. 2021. Archived from the original on 5 June 2021.
- Beevor, Antony (1991). Crete: The Battle and the Resistance. London: John Murray. ISBN 978-0-7195-4857-4.
- Clark, Alan (1962). The Fall of Crete. London: Anthony Blond. OCLC 559484870.
- Coulthard-Clark, Chris (1998). Where Australians Fought: The Encyclopaedia of Australia's Battles. St Leonards, New South Wales: Allen & Unwin. ISBN 978-1-86448-611-7.
- Davin, Daniel Marcus (1953). Crete. The Official History of New Zealand in the Second World War 1939–1945. Wellington: Historical Publications Branch, Department of Internal Affairs, Government of New Zealand. OCLC 1252361. Archived from the original on 28 July 2020.
- Davidson, I. A. (2004). "The Evacuation of the Heraklion Garrison from Crete, 28–29 May 1941". Journal of the Society for Army Historical Research. 82 (331): 210–226. JSTOR 44232721.
- "The Historical Combat Effectiveness of Lighter-Weight Armored Forces" (PDF). The Dupuy Institute. 2002. Archived (PDF) from the original on 15 October 2019.
- Falvey, Denis (1993). "The Battle for Crete – Myth and Reality". Journal of the Society for Army Historical Research. 71 (286): 119–126. JSTOR 44224765.
- Gilbert, Martin (1989). Second World War. London: Weidenfeld and Nicolson. ISBN 978-0-297-79616-9.
- Gill, G. Hermon (1957). Royal Australian Navy, 1939–1942 (PDF). Australia in the War of 1939–1945. Canberra: Australian War Memorial. OCLC 848228. Archived (PDF) from the original on 28 January 2021.
- Greene, Jack; Massignani, Alessandro (1998). The Naval War in the Mediterranean 1940–1943. London: Chatham Publishing. ISBN 978-1-86176-057-9.
- Hellenic Army History Directorate (1985). Επίτομη Ιστορία του Ελληνοϊταλικού και Ελληνογερμανικού Πολέμου 1940–1941 (Επιχειρήσεις Στρατού Ξηράς) [Abridged History of the Greco-Italian and Greco-German War 1940–1941 (Land Operations)] (in Greek). Athens: Hellenic Army History Directorate. OCLC 34158145.
- "Hellenic Civil Aviation Authority". Hellenic Civil Aviation Authority. Greek Ministry of Infrastructure and Transport. 2013. Archived from the original on 17 August 2018.
- Long, Gavin (1953). Greece, Crete and Syria. Australia in the War of 1939–1945. Vol. 2. Canberra: Australian War Memorial. OCLC 251302540. Archived from the original on 5 May 2021.
- MacDonald, Callum (1995). The Lost Battle: Crete 1941. London: Macmillan. ISBN 978-0-333-61675-8.
- Pack, S.W.C. (1973). The Battle for Crete. Annapolis, MD: Naval Institute Press. ISBN 978-0-87021-810-1.
- Pelvin, Richard (1991). "The Royal Australian Navy and the Evacuations from Greece and Crete". Australian Defence Force Journal. 88 (May–June): 43–47. ISSN 1320-2545.
- Playfair, Major-general I.S.O.; Flynn, Captain F.C.; Molony, Brigadier C.J.C. & Toomer, Air Vice-Marshal S.E. (2004) [1956]. Butler, J.R.M (ed.). The Mediterranean and Middle East: The Germans Come to the Help of their Ally (1941). History of the Second World War, United Kingdom Military Series. Vol. II. London: Naval & Military Press. ISBN 978-1-84574-066-5. Archived from the original on 27 October 2012.
- Prekatsounakis, Yannis (2017). The Battle for Heraklion. Crete 1941: The Campaign Revealed Through Allied and Axis Accounts. Solihull: Helion. ISBN 978-1-913336-01-1.
- Richards, Denis (1974) [1953]. Royal Air Force 1939–1945: The Fight at Odds. Vol. I (paperback (online) ed.). London: HMSO. ISBN 978-0-11-771592-9. Archived from the original on 24 September 2015.
- "Royal Leicestershire Regiment, Part VI". The Royal Leicestershire Regiment. Townsweb Archiving. 2015. Archived from the original on 27 November 2020.
- Spencer, John H. (1962). Battle for Crete. London: Heinemann. OCLC 2517566.
- Stubbs, David (2017). "Indefensible? A Reassessment of the Part Played by RAF Personnel in the Battle of Crete 1941". Air Power Review. 20 (1): 44–65.
- Vick, Alan (1995). Snakes in the Eagle's Nest: A History of Ground Attacks on Air Bases. Santa Monica: Rand Corporation. ISBN 978-0-8330-1629-4.
- Vogel, Detlef (1995). "German Intervention in the Balkans". In Schreiber, Gerhard; Stegemann, Bernd; Vogel, Detlef (eds.). Germany and the Second World War: The Mediterranean, South-east Europe, and North Africa, 1939–1941. Vol. III. London: Oxford University Press. ISBN 978-0-19-822884-4.
- Walker, Allan S. (1962) [1953]. Middle East and Far East (PDF). Australia in the War of 1939–1945. Canberra: Australian War Memorial. OCLC 6162767. Archived (PDF) from the original on 27 January 2021.
