= No. 30 Squadron RAF =

Flying squadron of the Royal Air Force

- No. 30 Squadron badge
- Active: 1915–1918 (RFC); 1918–1946; 1947–1967; 1968–2016; 2021–present
- Country: United Kingdom
- Branch: Royal Air Force
- Type: Flying squadron
- Role: Tactical air transport
- Part of: Air Mobility Force
- Station: RAF Brize Norton
- Mottos: Ventre a terre (French for 'All out')
- Aircraft: Airbus A400M Atlas C1

No. 30 Squadron is a squadron of the Royal Air Force which operates the Airbus A400M Atlas transport aircraft and is based at RAF Brize Norton, Oxfordshire.

The squadron was first formed as a unit of the Royal Flying Corps in 1915, serving through the rest of the First World War in Egypt and Mesopotamia, carrying out reconnaissance, bombing and air-to-air combat duties. After the end of the war, the squadron continued to serve in Iraq, attacking rebels against the British rule in Iraq and later rebels against the Iraqi government.

== History ==
=== First World War (1914–1918) ===
In November 1914 as war with the Turkish Empire became increasingly likely, the Royal Flying Corps despatched a flight of aircraft from Britain to Egypt to provide defence to the Suez Canal. Initial equipment consisted of Farman Longhorn and Shorthorn biplanes, which were soon supplemented by the Royal Aircraft Factory B.E.2 and Farman HF.20 sent from India. The flight, based at Ismailia Airfield, was redesignated No. 30 Squadron on 24 March 1915.

On 24 August 1915, the Mesopotamian Half Flight, a unit of the Australian Flying Corps stationed in Mesopotamia (now Iraq) was formally attached to No. 30 Squadron. For several months the Half-Flight, under Captain Henry Petre, and equipped with a mixture of Farman Shorthorns, Farman Longhorns and the Caudron G.3, had been flying operations in support of the Indian Army, against Turkish ground forces, during the Mesopotamian campaign.

On 26 August 1915, a second flight, equipped with Martinsyde Scouts, arrived at Basrah to join the No. 30 Squadron forces operating in Mesopotamia. The Martinsydes suffered from poor engine reliability in the heat and dusty conditions encountered. Despite this, a forward deployed detachment of the squadron supported the army's advance along the Tigris river, with reconnaissance by the squadron's aircraft helping the British and Indian forces to win the Battle of Es Sinn and capture Kut al-Imara in September 1915. In October 1915, the rest of the squadron moved to Mesopotamia, being relieved in Egypt by No. 14 Squadron. On 7 November, the squadron was reorganised with headquarters and B-Flight at Basra and A-Flight deployed forward at Azizaya.

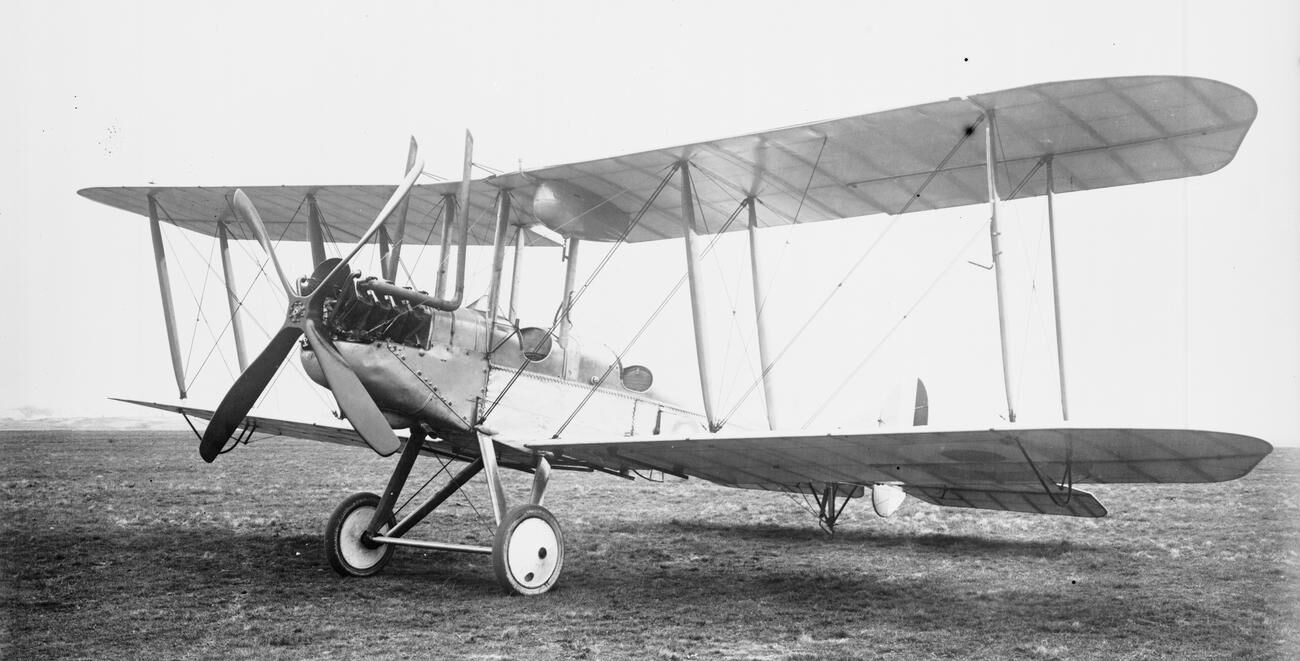
A Royal Aircraft Factory B.E.2 of the type operated by No. 30 Squadron during the First World War

No. 30 Squadron continued to support British forces as they advanced towards Baghdad, until the advance was stopped by the Battle of Ctesiphon on 22–25 November 1915. An air reconnaissance mission on the eve of the battle carried out by Major H. L Reilly of the squadron spotted that the Turkish positions in front of Ctesiphon had been heavily reinforced, but his aircraft was shot down by ground-fire and Reilly captured. It has been suggested in the Official Histories of the Air War and the Campaign in Mesopotamia, that if Reilly had successfully returned with his intelligence to the British lines, Major General Townshend, commander of the British force, would have aborted the attack. After Ctesiphon, the British column retreated to Kut al-Imara, pursued by the Turkish Army, and Kut was besieged from 7 December 1915. Those aircraft that could evacuate left Kut earlier that day, but most of the personnel of the forward deployed A- and B-Flights of the squadron, along with three unserviceable aircraft, were trapped in the besieged town.

While reduced in serviceable strength to only a single B.E.2, the squadron provided reconnaissance support to the force sent to relieve the troops trapped at Kut. The squadron was reinforced by four more B.E.2 in February 1916. The relief column failed to break through to Kut, and in April 1916, the squadron, with eight B.E.2, together with seven Royal Naval Air Service aircraft, carried out one of the earliest air supply mission when it air-dropped food and other supplies to the besieged garrison. While 19,000 lb (8,600 kg) of food was dropped between 15 and 29 April, this was insufficient to feed the trapped troops and the civilian population of the town, and Townshend surrendered on 29 April. The squadron built up its strength over the summer, and by August had thirteen B.E.2, which were supplemented by six Martinsyde Elephant scouts in September 1916. The squadron supported the resumed British offensive that started in December 1916, which resulted in the British capture of Baghdad on 11 March 1917, with the squadron moving to Baghdad airfield later that day. In April 1917, the Ottoman air defences were strengthened by the arrival of Halberstadt fighters from Germany, which outclassed the squadrons B.E.2. In response, two Bristol Scout fighters joined the squadron, with the promise that the more capable Spad VII would follow.

In August 1917, No. 63 Squadron arrived in Mesopotamia, so that No. 30 Squadron was no longer the sole source of air support for the British forces. In September of that year, the promised Spads arrived to replace the squadron's Bristol Scouts, while from October the Royal Aircraft Factory R.E.8 arrived to supersede the obsolete BE.2, which were phased out by February 1918. In December 1917 and January 1918, the squadron received two Airco DH.4 bombers, but both had been lost by the end of January 1918.

=== Interwar period (1919–1938) ===
No. 30 Squadron was sent to Iran in 1919 as part of the Norperforce. In April 1919, the squadron was reduced to a cadre at Baghdad, but not disbanded, and in February 1920, it returned to full strength at Baghdad as an Army co-operation squadron equipped with the RE.8, with these gradually being replaced by Airco DH.9A light bombers, with re-equipment being complete by early 1921.

From June 1920, the squadron, along with the rest of the RAF's strength in Iraq, (Note: 6 Squadron joined by 84 Squadron in August 1920, and 55 Squadron in September that year.) was deployed against an Iraqi revolt against British rule. In May–June 1921, No. 30 and No. 47 Squadron's DH.9A supported the establishing of a permanent Cairo–Baghdad land route, providing an air escort for vehicle convoys creating a visible track across the desert, while from 21 June that year the two squadrons began air-mail runs along the Cairo-Baghdad route.

In early 1924, aircraft from the squadron were deployed to Kirkuk for operations against a revolt led by the Kurdish leader Sheikh Mahmud Barzanji. The city of Sulaymaniyah, the base of Mahmud's operations was bombed, and Mahmud withdrew into the mountains. The squadron again saw action in the summers of 1925 and 1926 as Mahmud's rebellion reignited, attacking rebel-held villages. In late February 1938, a flight of No. 30 Squadron aircraft joined 'Akforce', a force of aircraft set up to stop Ikhwan nomadic raiders from Saudi Arabia attacking Iraq and Kuwait, these operations continuing until June.

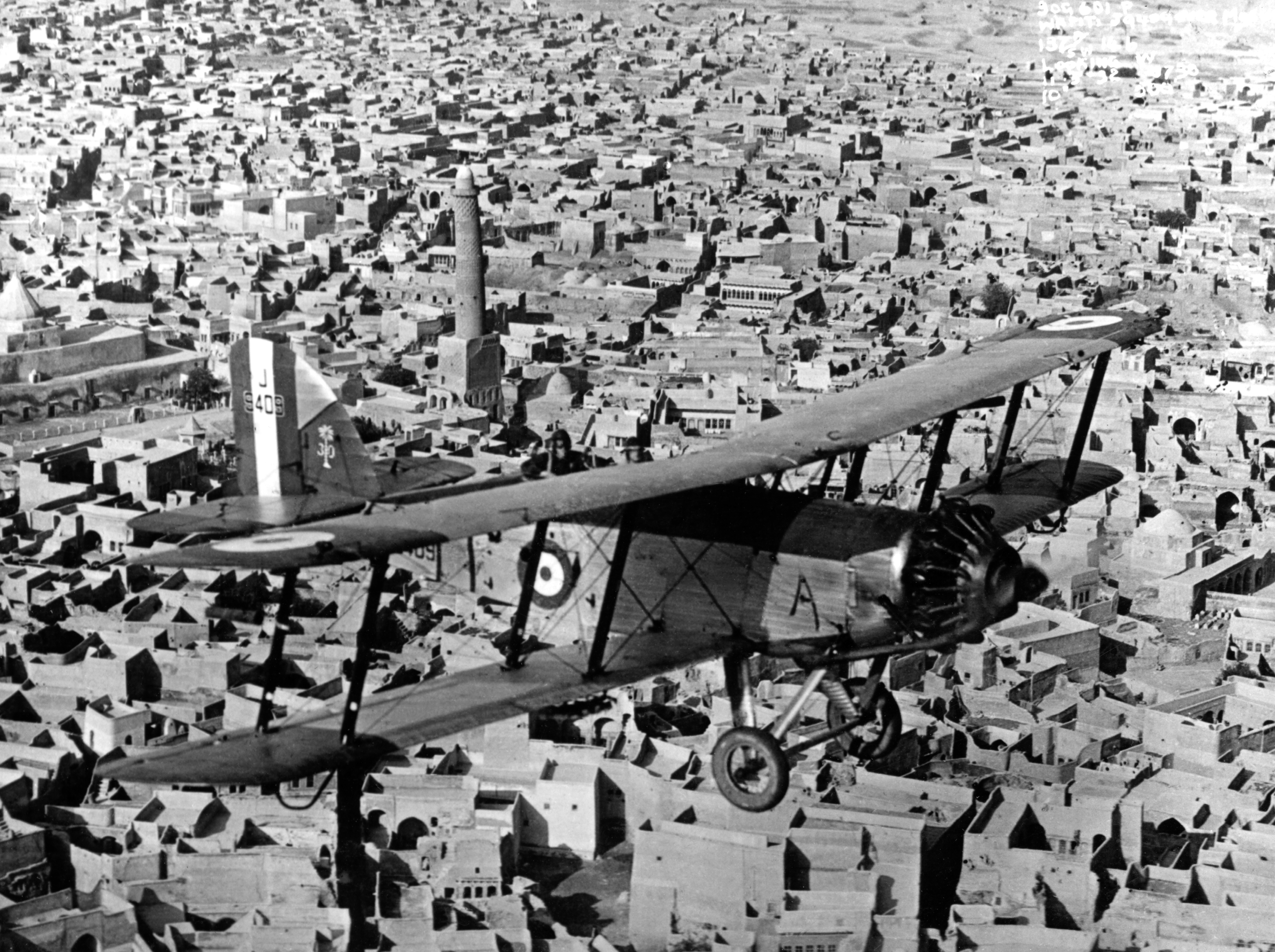
A Westland Wapiti Mk.IIa of No. 30 Squadron flying over Mosul, Iraq, in 1932.

In 1929, No. 30 Squadron replaced the DH.9A with the Westland Wapiti. In September 1930, Mahmud again raised a rebellion against the British and Iraqis, and the quadron supported Iraqi Army operations against the rebels. The campaign against Mahmud continued until May 1931, when Mahmud surrendered. Wapitis of No. 30 Squadron flew 2,204 hours between October 1930 and May 1931 in operations against Mahmud.

In March 1932, the Iraqi Army launched an offensive against a revolt by the supporters of Ahmed Barzani in Southern Kurdistan. No. 30 Squadron initially provided reconnaissance support to the Iraqi Army columns, but after one column was heavily attacked and forced to retreat, the RAF launched a series of air attacks against Barzani's forces until Barzani crossed the border into Turkey. In April–August 1935 the squadron received Hawker Hardys (a general purpose version of the Hawker Hart light bomber, modified for operations in the tropics), being the first squadron to receive the Hardy.

Between December 1922 and October 1929, No. 30 Squadron maintained a presence at RAF Hinaidi, the centre of operations for all British forces in Iraq since April 1921, located in the southern suburbs of Baghdad. This presence was in the form of either the whole squadron or at least a detachment. From October 1929 for the next seven years, No. 30 Squadron was based at RAF Mosul until October 1936 when the airfield (now the Mosul International Airport) was handed over to the Iraqi Air Force.

Between October 1924 and May 1935, twenty members of No. 30 squadron lost their lives in the service of their country whilst serving in Iraq and their bodies were buried at the Hinaidi RAF Peace Cemetery (later renamed the Ma’Asker Al Raschid RAF Cemetery). With the cemetery neglected for decades by the Commonwealth War Graves Commission, only six of the No. 30 Squadron headstones have survived the ravages of time out of the total of 300 burials at Ma’Asker.

In 1936, the squadron moved to the RAF's new base in Iraq, RAF Habbaniya. It re-equipped with modern Bristol Blenheim I monoplane bombers in 1938.

=== Second World War (1939–1945) ===
In August 1939, as war loomed, the squadron moved back to RAF Ismailia in Egypt and carried out escort missions in the Western Desert and provided fighter defence of Alexandria. (Note: Some of its Blenheims had been converted to Blenheim If long-range fighter configuration, with an under fuselage gun pack.) In November 1940, it was sent to Greece to operate its Blenheims in both the bomber and fighter roles, with the first of its Blenheims arriving at Eleusis airfield near Athens on 3 November, with forward deployments of the bombers to an airfield at Paramythia, while the squadron's fighter Blenheims remained back at Eleusis to protect Athens. In March 1941, the squadron was redesignated a fighter unit. On 5 April, five Blenheims were detached to Crete, and tasked with maritime reconnaissance, convoy escort and night fighting. More of the squadron's Blenheims were sent to Maleme Airfield on Crete on 17 April, from where they provided air cover for the evacuation from the Greek mainland, flying standing patrols over the evacuation beaches. By the middle of May, German air attacks on Crete had made the squadron's operations from the island untenable, and on 15 May the squadrons remaining three airworthy Blenheims were evacuated to Egypt. Despite this, 229 officers and men from No. 30 and No. 33 Squadrons remained at Maleme when the Germans launched an attack on the airfield by airborne troops on 20 May. Many of these airmen, despite being poorly armed took part in the defence of Maleme before the survivors attempted to evacuate via Sfakia. Losses were heavy.

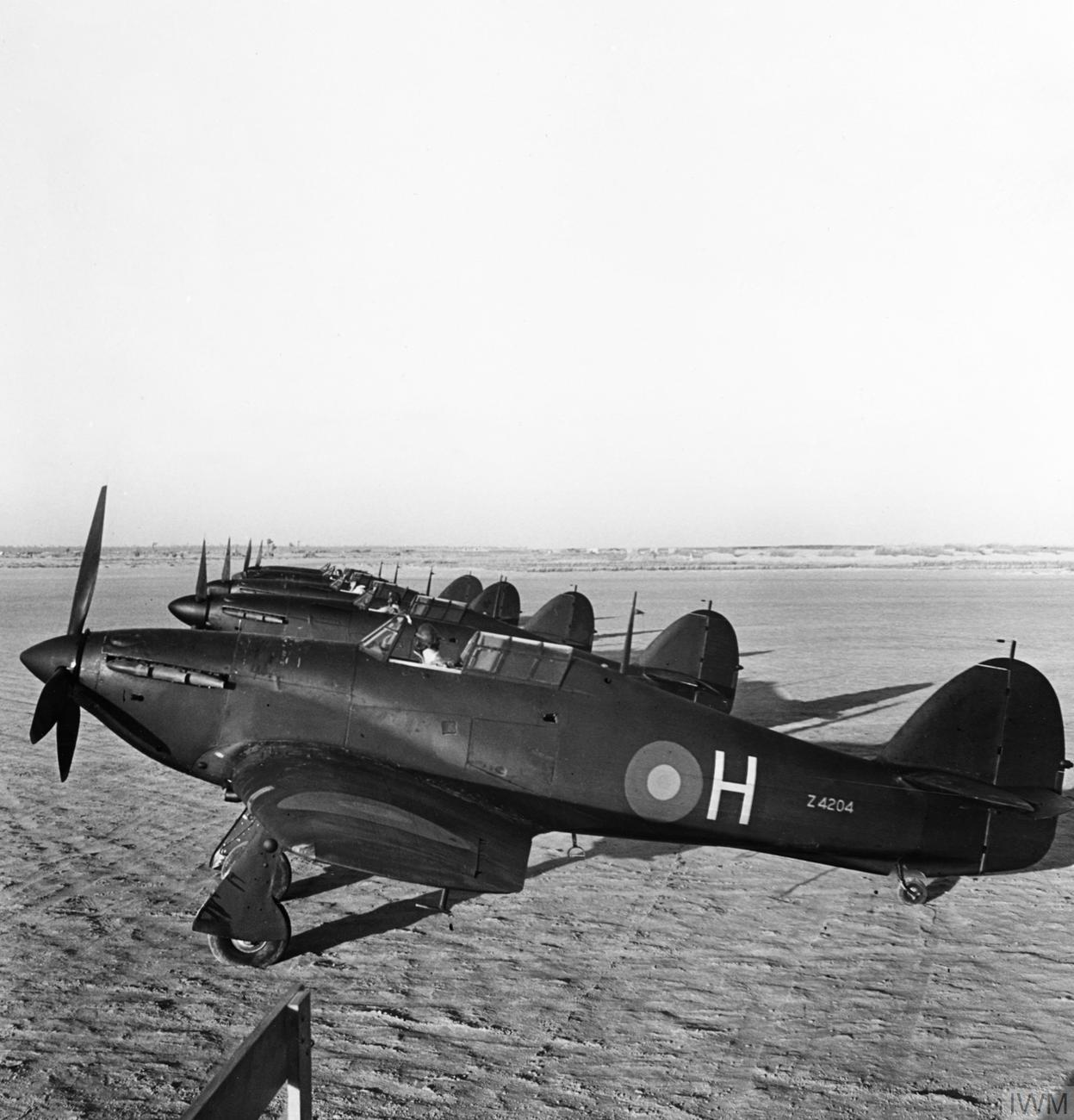
A Hawker Hurricane Mk.I of B-Flight, No. 30 Squadron, lined up at Idku, Egypt, while operating in the night-fighter role for the air defence of Alexandria during the Second World War

After the losses during the fall of Greece and the Battle of Crete, the squadron was rebuilt as a fighter unit equipped with Hawker Hurricanes and employed on night defence of Alexandria and shipping protection patrols before moving on to operations in the Western Desert.

When the situation in the Far East worsened, the squadron was ordered to reinforce allied forces in Java, but by the time the squadron left Egypt, Java, had already fallen, and the squadron was ferried by the Royal Navy aircraft carrier HMS Indomitable to Ceylon arriving on 6 March 1942, just in time to assist in resisting the Japanese carrier strike against the island. This raid took place on 5 April 1942 with twenty-one aircraft being launched from its base at RAF Ratmalana whilst under heavy fire from Japanese aircraft. Seven of the squadron's Hurricanes were lost, with five of its pilots being killed or dying later of wounds received during the battle. It claimed fourteen Japanese aircraft shot down, together with six probably destroyed and five damaged, out of a total claim for the whole of the island's defences of twenty-four shot down, seven probables and nine damaged. In fact, the Japanese lost seven aircraft, with a further fifteen damaged. For the rest of 1942 and 1943, the squadron remained on Ceylon, where it carried out target towing as well as maintaining its aircrew's training.

On 28 January 1944, the squadron left Ceylon for the Burma front, flying escort missions for Douglas Dakota and Curtiss C-46 transport aircraft over the Kaladan valley. In March, it added night ground-attack sorties against river craft to its escort duties, and moved to Comilla on 10 April 1944.

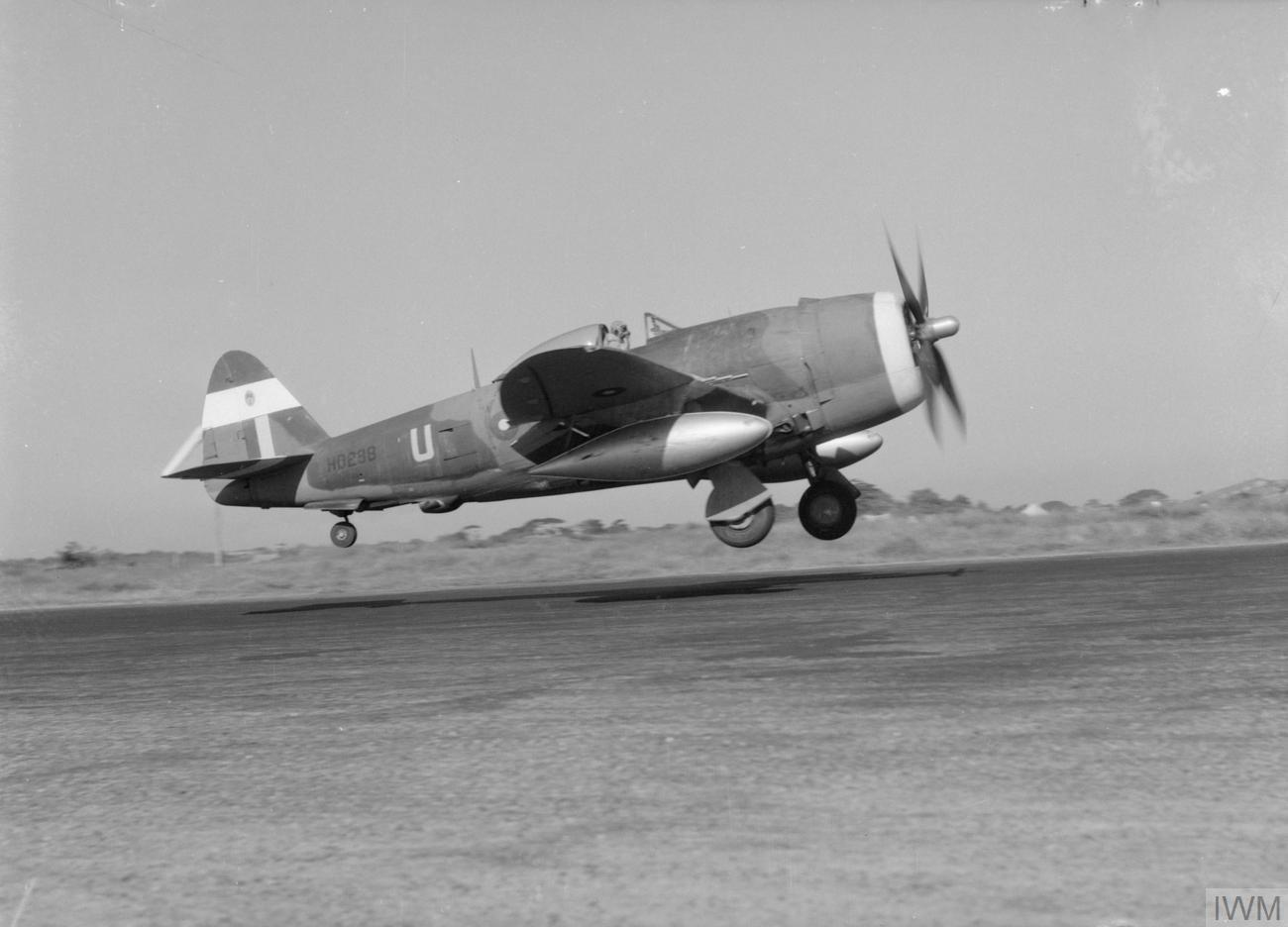
Republic Thunderbolt Mk. II of No. 30 Squadron taking off from Chittagong, 1944

On 25 May 1944, the squadron was pulled out of the front line back to Yelahanka near Bangalore for re-equipment with American Republic P-47 Thunderbolts. It returned to action in October, carrying out bomber and transport escort, and ground attack with guns, bombs and napalm. It operated in support of XV Corps of the British Indian Army until the end of March. Operating from Akyab, the squadron supported Operation Dracula, the Anglo-Indian amphibious landings at Rangoon on 1 May. Following the capture of Rangoon, with a lull of operations, the squadron was pulled out of the front line to prepare for Operation Zipper, the planned British invasion of Malaya, but the Japanese surrender on 15 August meant that the squadron was not needed to support the landings.

=== Cold War (1946–1990s) ===
After the Japanese surrender, No. 30 Squadron remained in India and in March 1946 its Thunderbolts were replaced by the Hawker Tempest F.2, operating over the North-West frontier and carrying out a similar air policing role as it did in its pre-war time in Iraq. The squadron lost its aircraft on 1 December 1946, before being disbanded on 1 April 1947 at Agra.

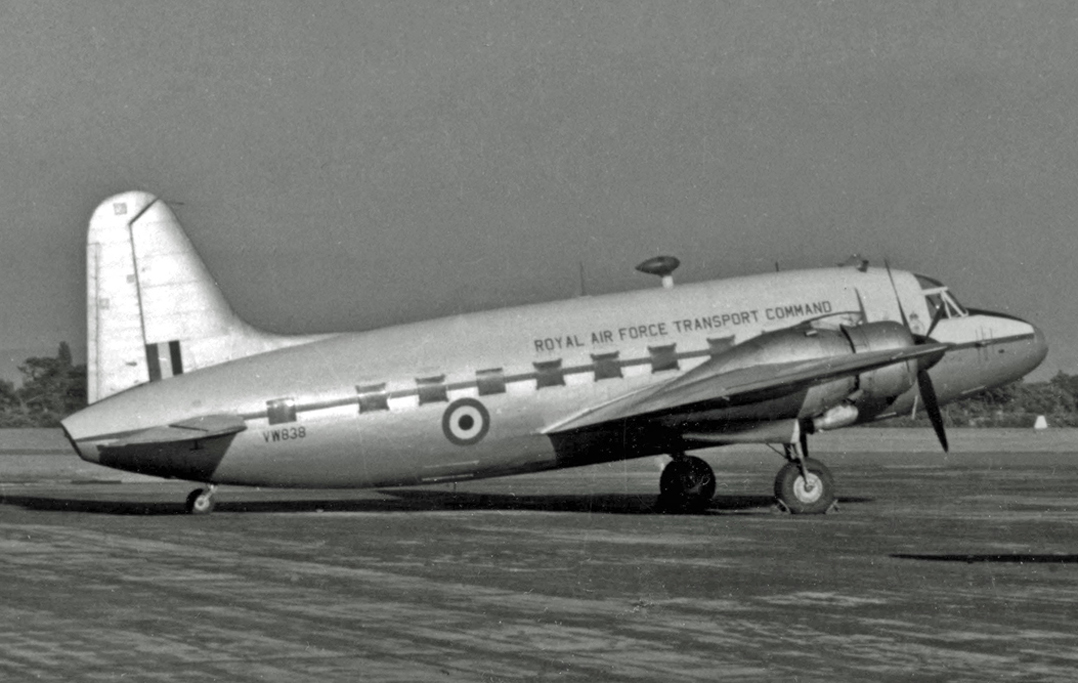
A Vickers Valetta C.1 of No. 30 Squadron at Manchester Airport in 1953

On 24 November 1947, the squadron was reformed at RAF Oakington, Cambridgeshire in the transport role, operating as part of RAF Transport Command. It flew the Dakota on numerous humanitarian supply flights during the Berlin Airlift. It moved to RAF Abingdon in November 1950, and from December that year re-equipped with the Vickers Valetta transport aircraft. The squadron moved to RAF Benson in May 1952, and to RAF Dishforth in April 1953. The heavier four-engine Blackburn Beverley was flown between April 1957 and September 1967.

From November 1959, the squadron operated out of RAF Eastleigh in Kenya, before moving on to RAF Muharraq in Bahrain in October 1964.

The Squadron temporarily disbanded in September 1967, but quickly reformed in June 1968 at RAF Fairford in Gloucestershire equipped with the turbine-propeller powered Lockheed C-130 Hercules tactical transport aircraft, maintaining the units transport role. The squadron moved to RAF Lyneham, also in Wiltshire in September 1971.

=== 21st century (2000– present) ===
During 2008, the squadron's A-Flight was based at RAF Al Udeid in Qatar operating the Hercules C4.

The squadron flew its last Hercules flight on 8 December 2016. It then took on an administrative role and later reformed on 28 September 2021 to become the second frontline squadron operating the Airbus A400M Atlas C1.

== Aircraft operated ==
- Farman Longhorn (1915)
- Farman Shorthorn (1915–1916)
- Voisin LAS (1915–1916)
- Henry Farman F27 (1915)
- Caudron G.3 (1915)
- Royal Aircraft Factory B.E.2 (1915–1917)
- Royal Aircraft Factory R.E.8 (1917–1919)
- Airco D.H.9 (1921–1929)
- Westland Wapiti (1929–1935)
- Hawker Hardy (1935–1938)
- Bristol Blenheim (1938–1941)
- Hawker Hurricane (1941–1944)
- Republic P-47 Thunderbolt (1944–1946)
- Hawker Tempest F.2 (1946)
- Douglas Dakota (1947–1950)
- Vickers Valetta C.1 (1950–1957)
- Blackburn Beverley C.1 1957–1967
- Lockheed C-130 Hercules C1, C3, C4 and C5 (1968–2016)
- Airbus A400M Atlas C1 (2021–present)

== Heritage ==
=== Badge and motto ===
The squadron's badge features a date palm tree, signifying the squadron's long service in the Middle East. It was approved by King George VI in May 1938.

The squadron's motto is Ventre a terre (French for 'All out').

=== Memorials ===
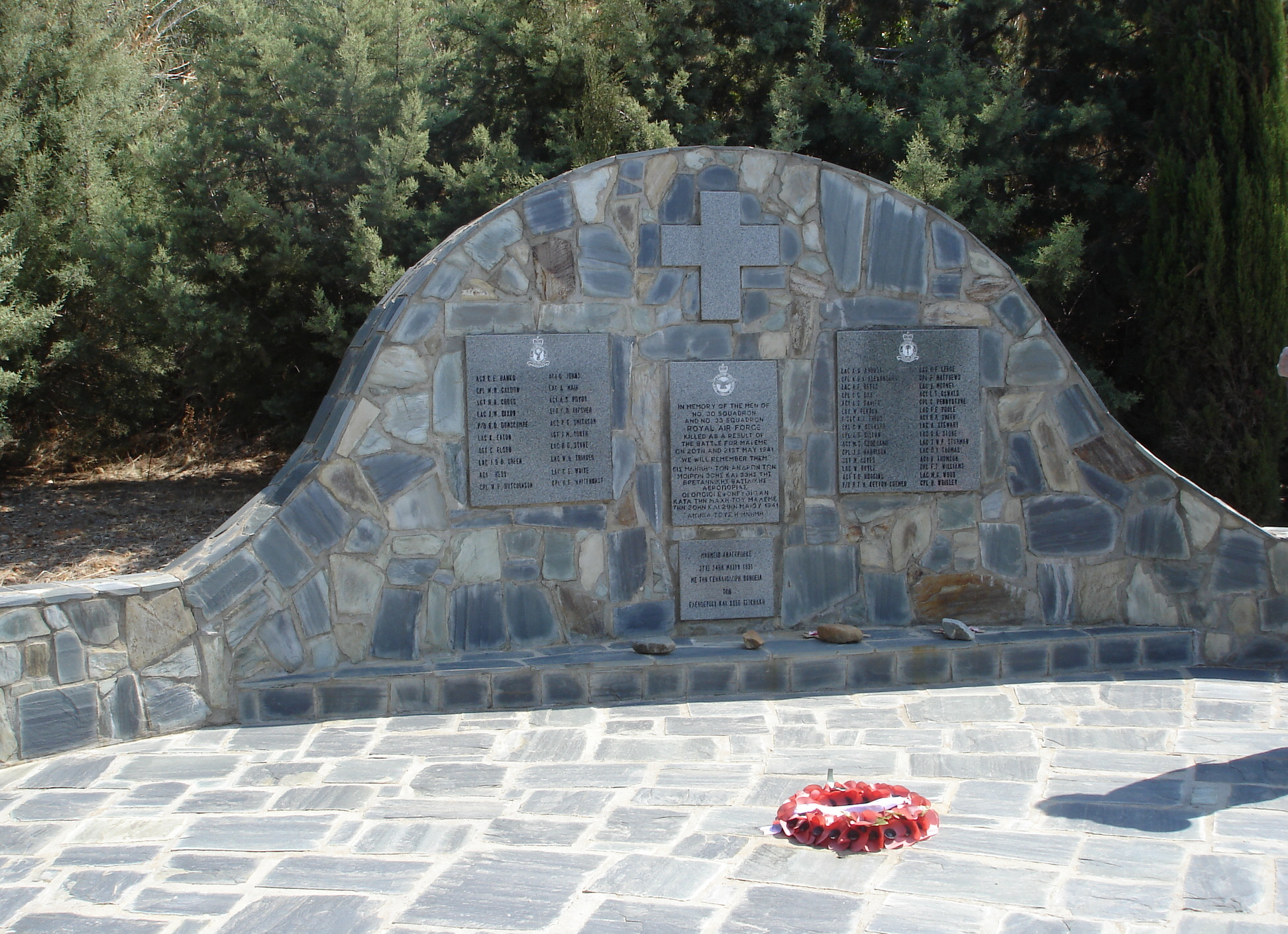
Memorial in Crete, dedicated to members of No. 30 Squadron and No. 33 Squadron who were killed in the Battle of Crete, 1941

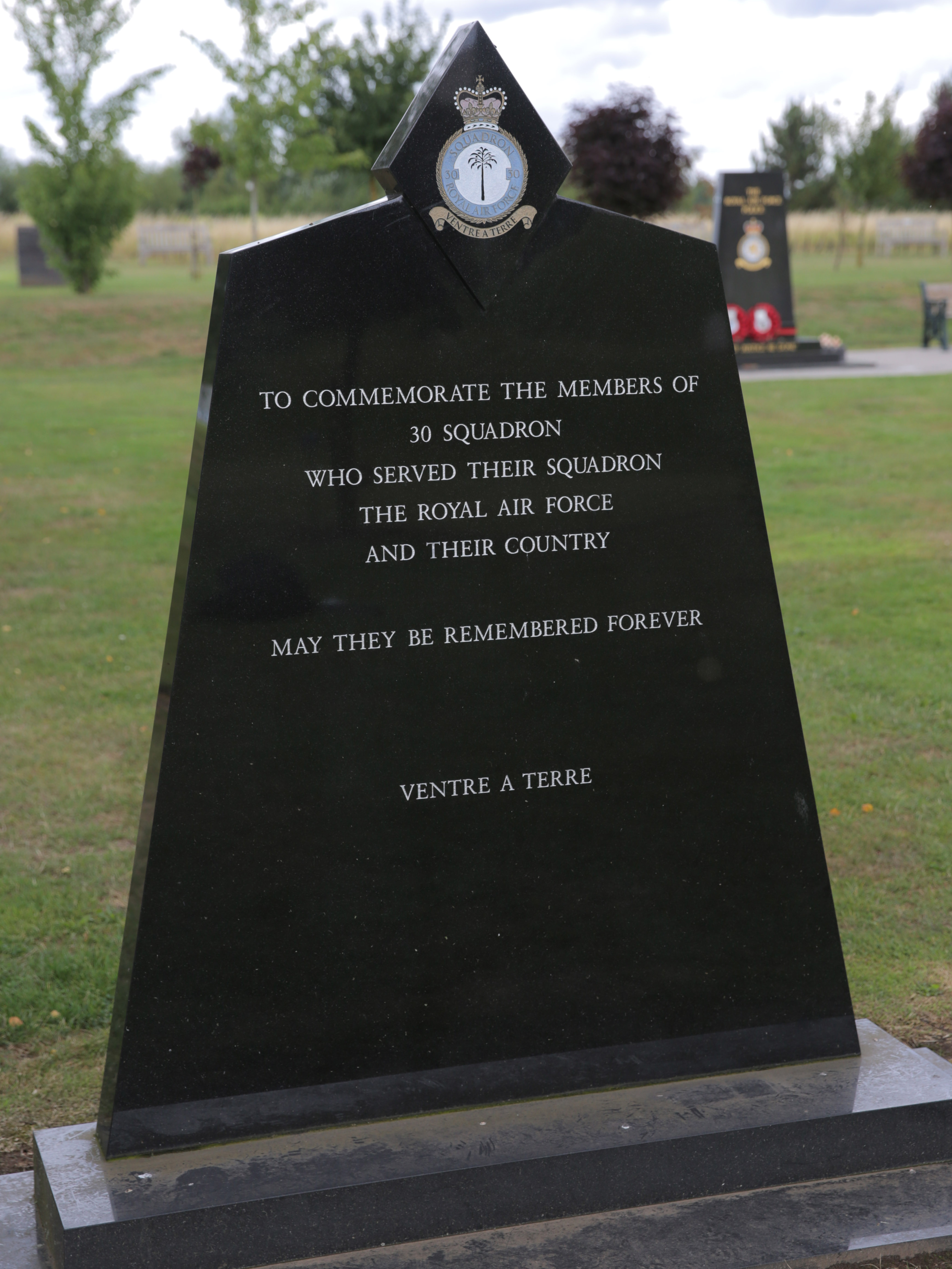
No. 30 Squadron memorial at the National Memorial Arboretum

==== Crete ====
A memorial to the airmen of No. 30 Squadron and No. 33 Squadron who died during the Battle of Crete in 1941 is located between Maleme and Tavronitis (35.525363°N 23.828619°E) on the Greek island of Crete. It overlooks the Iron Bridge across the River Tavronitis and the Maleme Airport runway.

==== National Memorial Arboretum ====
A memorial to all who have served with No. 30 Squadron was unveiled in September 2008 at the National Memorial Arboretum in Staffordshire. It was designed and made from Chinese granite by Johnson Stonemason of Westbury.

== Battle honours ==
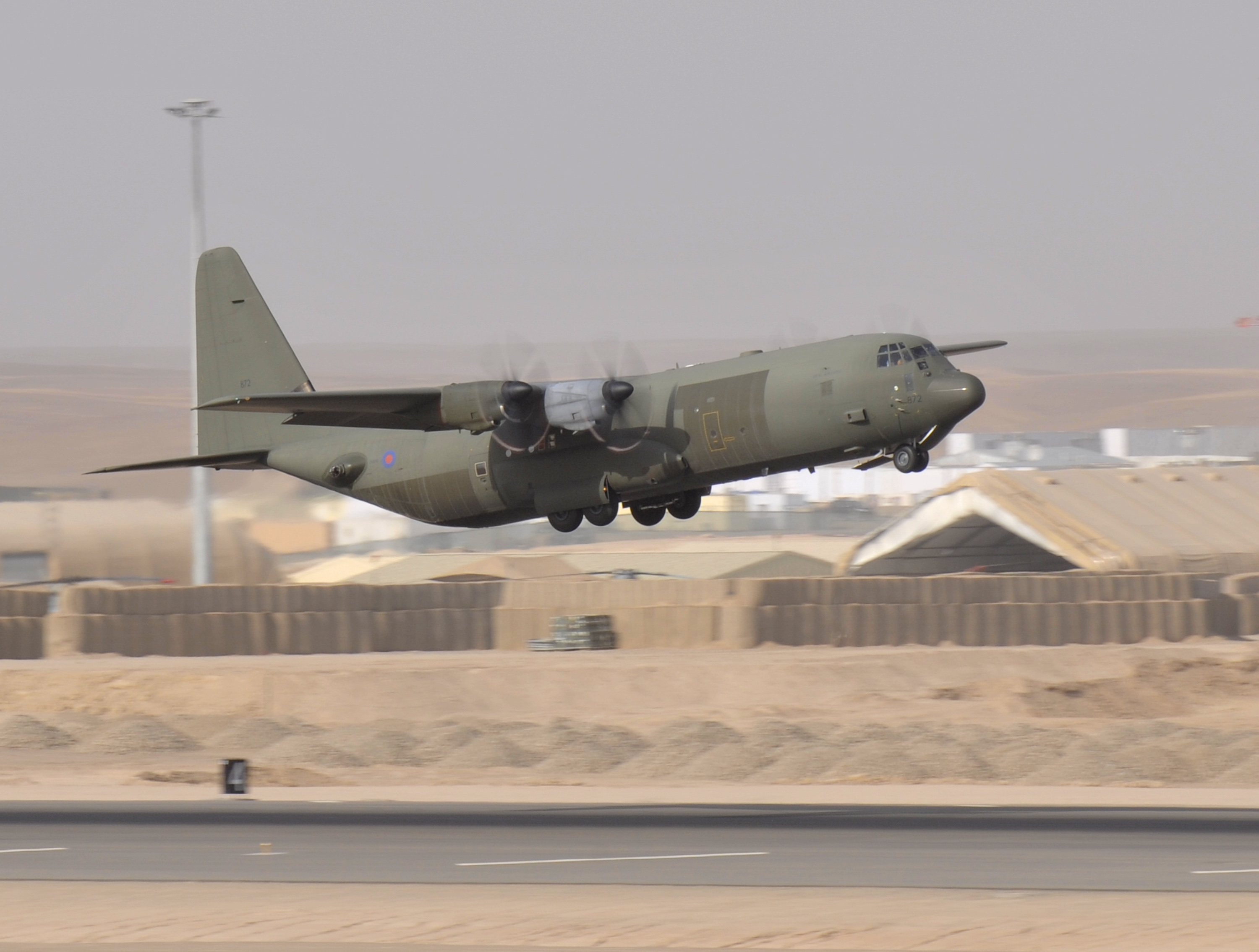
An RAF C-130 Hercules takes off from Camp Bastion, Afghanistan during 2011

No. 30 Squadron has received the following battle honours. Those marked with an asterisk (*) may be emblazoned on the squadron standard. List from Ashworth except where stated.

- Egypt (1915)*
- Mesopotamia (1915–1918)*
- Iraq (1919–1920)
- North West Persia (1920)
- Kurdistan (1922–1924)
- Iraq (1923–1925)
- Iraq (1928–1929)
- Kurdistan (1930–1931)
- Northern Kurdistan (1932)
- Egypt and Libya (1940–1942)*
- Greece (1940–1941)*
- Mediterranean (1940–1941)*
- Ceylon (April 1942)*
- Arakan (1944)*
- Burma (1944–1945)*
- South Atlantic (1982)
- Gulf (1991)
- Afghanistan (2001–2014)
- Iraq (2003–2011)
- Libya (2011)

== See also ==
- List of Royal Air Force aircraft squadrons
