= Brian Chappel =

British Army general (1895–1964)

Major-General Brian Herbert Chappel DSO**
- Born: 25 September 1895
- Died: 14 November 1964 (aged 69); Eastbourne, East Sussex, England
- Military career
- Allegiance: United Kingdom
- Branch: British Army; British Indian Army
- Rank: Major-General
- Service number: 188415
- Conflicts: World War I World War II
- Awards: Distinguished Service Order with two bars

Major-General Brian Herbert Chappel, DSO & Two Bars (25 November 1895 – 14 November 1964) was a British soldier who served during the First World War and Second World War.

== Sources ==
- Auction - The Second World War D.S.O. and 2 bars awarded to Major General B.H. Chappel, Indian Army, and commanding officer at Heraklion during the Battle of Crete
- Generals of World War II

Military offices
Preceded by Geoffrey Charles Evans	Commandant of the Staff College, Quetta; 1943−1944	Succeeded by Hugh Vivian Collingridge
