= 11th Air Corps =

XI. Fliegerkorps German 11th Air Corps
- Flag of a commanding general of a Fliegerkorps
- Active: 1941–1943
- Country: Nazi Germany
- Branch: Luftwaffe
- Engagements: World War II

XI. Fliegerkorps (11th Air Corps) was a formation of the German Luftwaffe in World War II.

It was commanded by Kurt Student and participated in the Battle of Crete.
