= Maleme Airport =

Airport situated between Maleme and Tavronitis, Crete

- IATA: none; ICAO: none

Summary
- Airport type: Public
- Serves: Chania
- Location: Maleme
- Elevation AMSL: 16 ft / 5 m
- Coordinates: 35°31′45.70″N 23°49′56.23″E

Map
- Location in Greece

Runways
Direction	Length		Surface
Direction	ft	m	Surface
13/31	3,454	1,050	Asphalt
03/21	3,125	950	Asphalt
- Source:Airliners.gr Maleme

Maleme Airport (Greek: Αεροδρόμιο Μάλεμε) is an airport situated between Maleme and Tavronitis, Crete. It has two runways (13/31 and 03/21) with no lights. The airport has closed for commercial aviation, but the Chania Aeroclub continues to use it. The airport operated until 1959 as the main public airport of Chania. Up until 2012 the Hellenic Air Force made limited use of the facility.

Originally known as Maleme Airfield, it was an RAF base in World War II until captured by German parachutists and mountain troops landing there in May 1941 as part of the Battle of Crete.

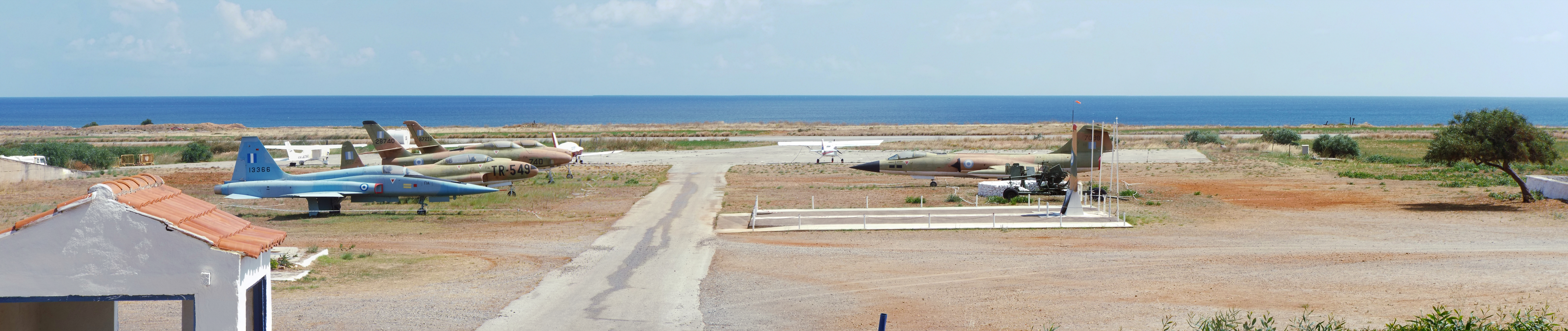
Maleme Airport access road flanked by retired Hellenic Air Force jets, with small collection of light aircraft beyond them, 2018

== See also ==
- List of airports in Crete
