= Maleme =

Village in Crete, Greece

Maleme Μάλεμε
- Community
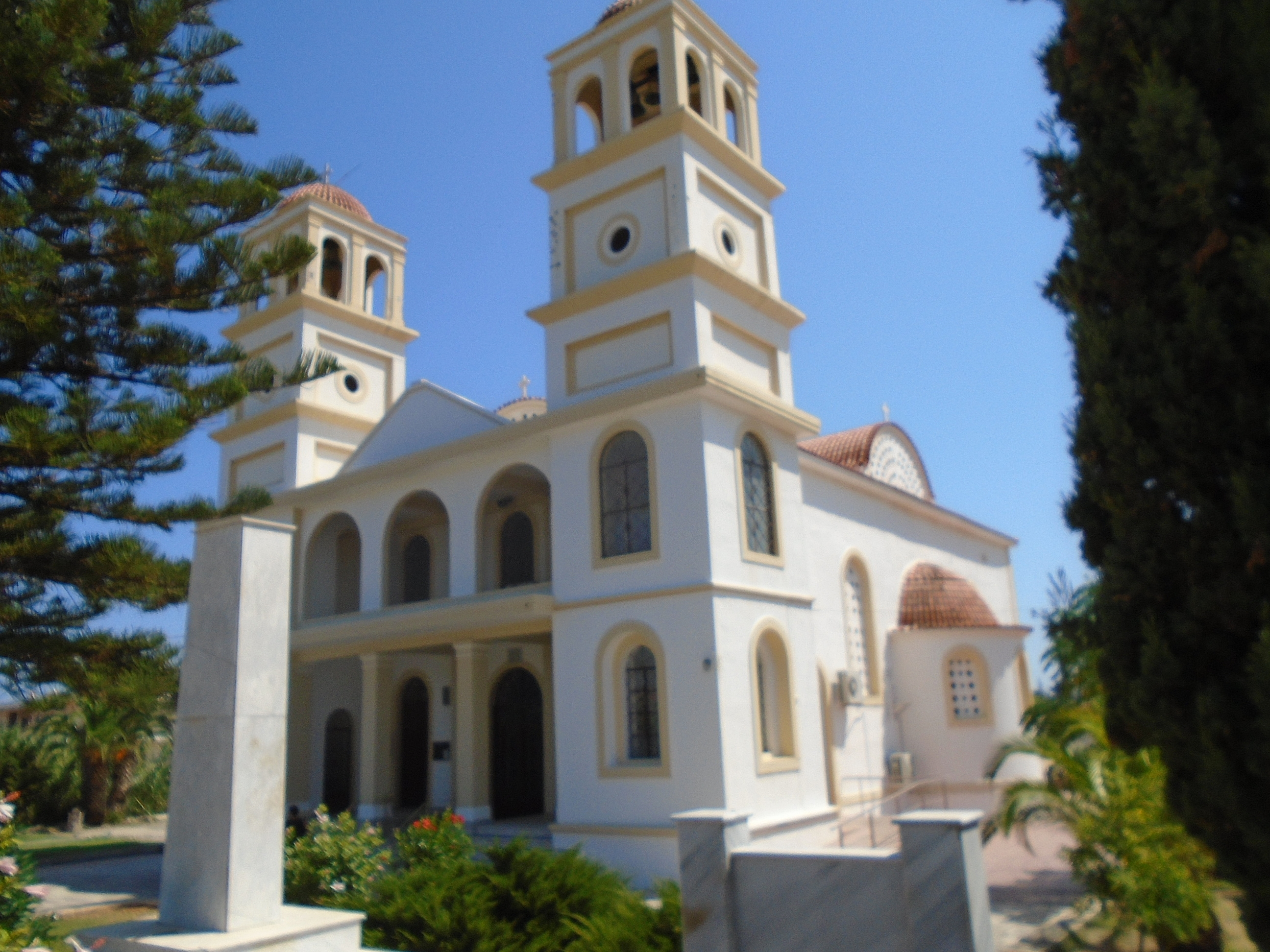
- Maleme church (Agios Antonios)

- Location within Greece
- Coordinates: 35°31′20″N 23°50′51″E
- Country: Greece
- Administrative region: Crete
- Regional unit: Chania
- Municipality: Platanias
- Municipal unit: Platanias

Population (2021)
  - Community: 568
- Time zone: UTC+2 (EET)
  - Summer (DST): UTC+3 (EEST)

Maleme (Greek: Μάλεμε) is a small village and civilian airfield 16 km (9.9 mi) to the west of Chania, in north western Crete, Greece. It is located in Platanias municipality, in Chania regional unit.

== History ==
=== Bronze Age ===
A Late Minoan tholos tomb has been discovered in the vicinity of Maleme. The tholos tomb, located on "Kafkala" hill, was accidentally revealed and then looted at the beginning of the 20th century. During World War II a bomb caused the partial destruction of its roof and the backfill of the chamber. It is a significant funerary monument excavated in 1966 by the curator Mr. C. Davaras and partly restored in 1970. It dates back to the Late Minoan III A-B era (14th-13th c. B.C.). A corridor ("dromos"), 25.10m long and 1.60m wide, leads to the chamber. A step in the middle separates the dromos into two parts. The walls are coated with coarse stones, while a slim layer of reddish mortar covered its floor. There is a large lintel over the entrance to the chamber (2m high and 1.60m wide) and a relieving triangle, open to the chamber and covered with a slab on the front. The stone threshold bears two sockets for the reception of pivots of a wooden gate. The chamber was finally blocked with a stone walling.

The burial chamber, very carefully built with large porous stones, square in ground plan (4.36m x 4.46m), should have ended in a pyramidal roof. Its floor consisted of pebbles knitted together with lime mortar, while parts of the walls were coated with ivory-coloured mortar. Just two seal stones have been preserved among the grave goods, one made of copper, the other made of agate, together with some pot fragments.

=== World War II ===
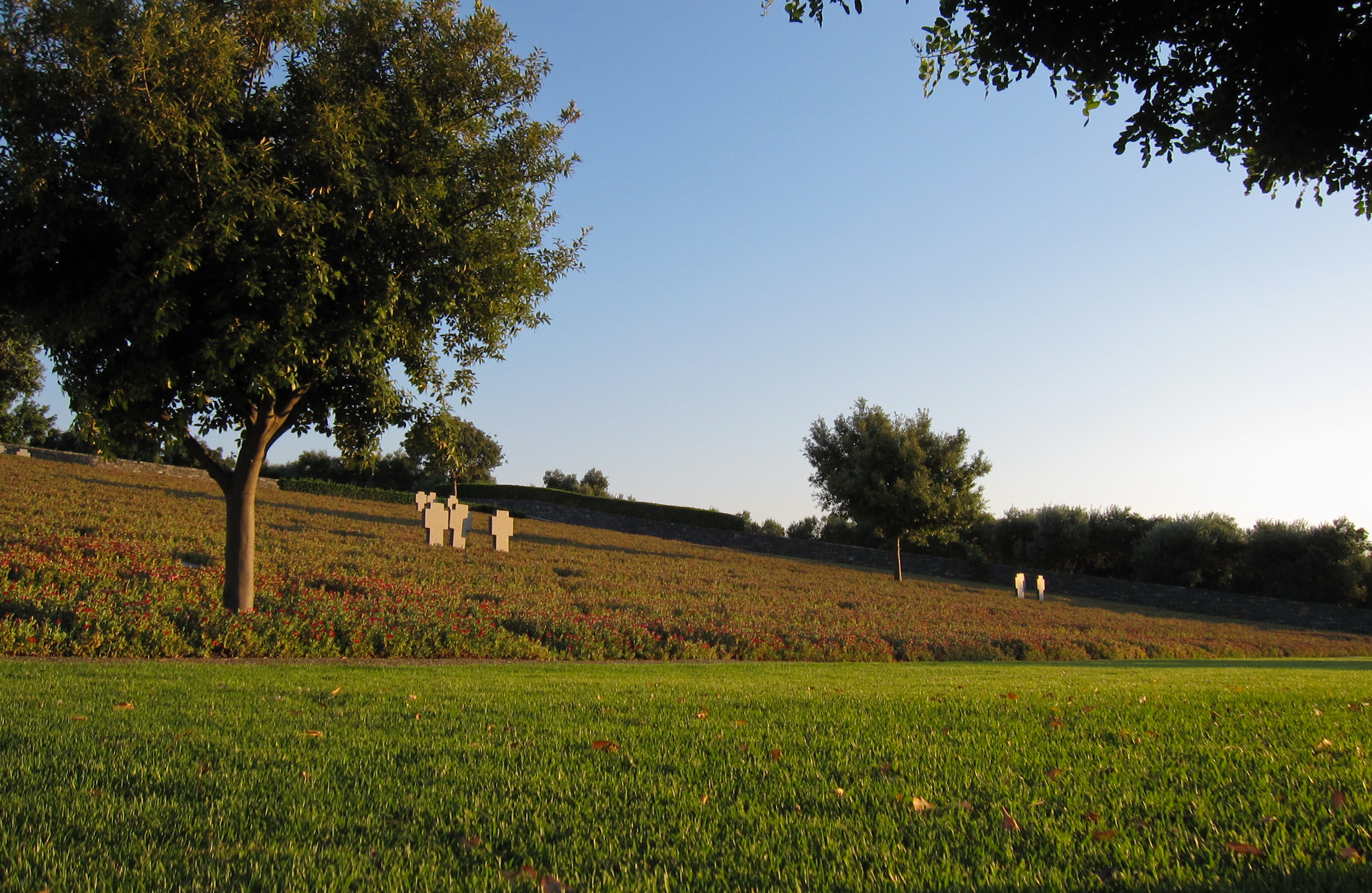
German War Cemetery in Maleme

Maleme is best known as a landing site for German paratroopers invading Crete in 1941, at the start of the Battle of Crete (Operation Mercury) during World War II. The paratroopers captured the airstrip, which was located just outside the town. Once captured, this airstrip allowed the Germans to airlift in the reinforcements needed to capture the rest of the island. Many of the paratroopers lost their lives in the attack and are buried in the German war cemetery (35.522395°N 23.8311892°E) located on a hill above Maleme.

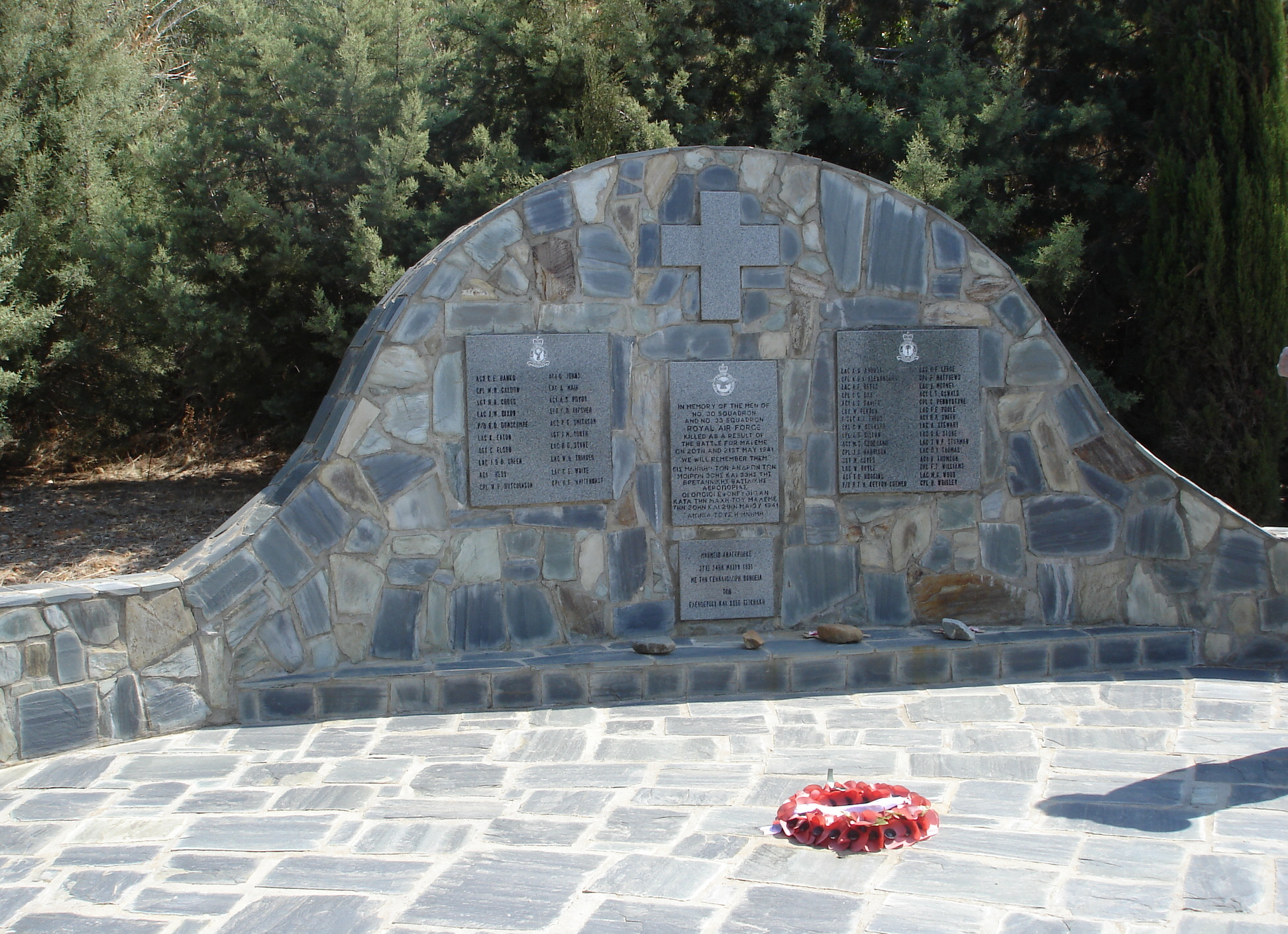
Memorial to members of 30 and 33 Squadrons RAF killed in the Battle of Crete

There is a Royal Air Force (RAF) memorial to the airmen of 30 and 33 Squadrons who died during the battle. The memorial is located (35.525363°N 23.828619°E) behind the roadside hedge between Maleme and Tavronitis overlooking the (35.526625°N 23.8256°E) Iron Bridge across the Tavronitis River and the end of Maleme aerodrome.

== See also ==
- Battle of Crete
- Brothers von Blücher
- Maleme Airport
