= Skourvoula executions =

Massacre in Greece during World War II

Coordinates: 35.1039°N 24.8406°E

The Skourvoula executions (Greek: εκτελέσεις στα Σκούρβουλα) refer to the mass execution by firing squad of 36 civilians, of which 22 were women, at the village of Skourvoula in Crete, Greece by German Wehrmacht forces on 14 August 1944 during World War II.

== Background ==
The village of Skourvoula (Greek: Σκούρβουλα) is located at an altitude of 350 metres (1,150 ft), 60 kilometres (37 mi) southwest of Heraklion. It is built on the southern slopes of Mt Psiloritis, overlooking the Messara Plain. During the Axis occupation of Crete, the entire region of Psiloritis sheltered local resistance fighters and British SOE agents. To intimidate the civilian population, General Friedrich-Wilhelm Müller who was commanding the German garrison on Crete during the summer of 1944, had issued orders for retaliatory measures against the population of "hostile" villages.

== The executions ==
On 12 August 1944, two German soldiers stationed at Tympaki arrived at Skourvoula, tasked with the collection of eggs for the provision of the occupation troops. On their way back, they were ambushed by partisans who shot and killed them. In fear of German reprisals, the male inhabitants of Skourvoula decided to flee to the mountain. On the following day, carrying out Müller's orders, a German company marched into Skourvoula and arrested all villagers. After interrogations and brief imprisonment, they were released and allowed to return to their homes.

On 14 August 1944, German forces returned and rounded up the inhabitants. A total of 36 locals, mostly from Skourvoula but also from the neighboring villages Magarikari, Kamares and Petrokefalo were shot at a site near the southwest edge of the village in front of the eyes of their relatives. Certain sources report 12 additional victims of impromptu shootings in the vicinity of the village.

== Aftermath ==
No reparations were ever paid to the families of the victims. Müller was found guilty of ordering atrocities against civilians in Crete and was executed by firing squad on 20 May 1947.

A monument in remembrance of the victims has been erected at the place of their execution.

== See also ==
- Razing of Anogeia
- Holocaust of Kedros
- Malathyros executions
- Viannos massacres
