= Malathyros executions =

1944 Greek mass execution

Coordinates: 35.4324°N 23.7194°E

The Malathyros executions (Greek: εκτελέσεις στη Μαλάθυρο) refer to the mass execution by firing squad of 61 male civilians from the village of Malathyros in Crete, Greece by German forces on 28 August 1944 during World War II.

== Background ==
The village of Malathyros (also spelled Malathiros, Greek: Μαλάθυρος) is located at an altitude of 330 metres (1,080 ft), 16.5 kilometres (10.3 mi) southeast of Kissamos and 45 kilometres (28 mi) southwest of Chania. During the Axis occupation of Crete, the village had a population of approximately 300 people who sheltered British SOE personnel and aided local resistance fighters. Commander of the German garrison on Crete at the time was General Friedrich-Wilhelm Müller.

== The executions ==
In the early morning of 28 August 1944, German forces surrounded Malathyros. Male villagers were dragged from their homes and herded to the school. For the entire day, they were interrogated to reveal the whereabouts of the British, but they refused to cooperate despite being tortured and brutally beaten. Near sunset, they were marched outside the village and shot in a nearby canyon. The village was looted.

== Aftermath ==
The executions almost eradicated the male population of the village, leaving many women without any support in raising their orphaned children. No reparations were ever paid to the families of the victims. One of the hostages, Giannis Kartsonakis (Γιάννης Καρτσωνάκης), survived the execution and the following coup de grâce and was later ordained an Orthodox priest.

A monument commemorating the victims has been erected in the village square. A memorial service is held annually at the church.

On 16 December 1998, Malathyros was declared a martyred village (Presidential Decree 399, ΦΕΚ A 277/16.12.1998).

== See also ==
- Razing of Anogeia
- Skourvoula executions
- Viannos massacres
- Holocaust of Kedros
- Alikianos executions
