= List of Knight's Cross of the Iron Cross recipients of the Fallschirmjäger =

The Knight's Cross of the Iron Cross (German: Ritterkreuz des Eisernen Kreuzes) and its variants were the highest military award in Nazi Germany. Recipients are grouped by grades of the Knight's Cross. During World War II, 133 German soldiers and officers of the Fallschirmjäger (Paratrooper) service, which was a part of the Luftwaffe, received the Knight's Cross of the Iron Cross. Among them, 22 officers received the Knight's Cross of the Iron Cross with Oak Leaves (Ritterkreuz des Eisernen Kreuzes mit Eichenlaub), seven the Knight's Cross of the Iron Cross with Oak Leaves and Swords (Ritterkreuz des Eisernen Kreuzes mit Eichenlaub und Schwertern), and one won the Knight's Cross of the Iron Cross with Oak Leaves Swords and Diamonds (Ritterkreuz des Eisernen Kreuzes mit Eichenlaub, Schwertern und Brillanten).

== Background ==
The Knight's Cross of the Iron Cross and its higher grades were based on four separate enactments. The first enactment, Reichsgesetzblatt I S. 1573 of 1 September 1939 instituted the Iron Cross (Eisernes Kreuz), the Knight's Cross of the Iron Cross and the Grand Cross of the Iron Cross (Großkreuz des Eisernen Kreuzes). Article 2 of the enactment mandated that the award of a higher class be preceded by the award of all preceding classes. As the war progressed, some of the recipients of the Knight's Cross distinguished themselves further and a higher grade, the Knight's Cross of the Iron Cross with Oak Leaves (Ritterkreuz des Eisernen Kreuzes mit Eichenlaub), was instituted. The Oak Leaves, as they were commonly referred to, were based on the enactment Reichsgesetzblatt I S. 849 of 3 June 1940. In 1941, two higher grades of the Knight's Cross were instituted. The enactment Reichsgesetzblatt I S. 613 of 28 September 1941 introduced the Knight's Cross of the Iron Cross with Oak Leaves and Swords (Ritterkreuz des Eisernen Kreuzes mit Eichenlaub und Schwertern) and the Knight's Cross of the Iron Cross with Oak Leaves, Swords and Diamonds (Ritterkreuz des Eisernen Kreuzes mit Eichenlaub, Schwertern und Brillanten). At the end of 1944 the final grade, the Knight's Cross of the Iron Cross with Golden Oak Leaves, Swords, and Diamonds (Ritterkreuz des Eisernen Kreuzes mit goldenem Eichenlaub, Schwertern und Brillanten), based on the enactment Reichsgesetzblatt 1945 I S. 11 of 29 December 1944, became the final variant of the Knight's Cross authorized.

== Recipients ==
The Oberkommando der Wehrmacht (Supreme Command of the Armed Forces) kept separate Knight's Cross lists, one for each of the three military branches, Heer (Army), Kriegsmarine (Navy), Luftwaffe (Air force) and for the Waffen-SS. Within each of these lists a unique sequential number was assigned to each recipient. The same numbering paradigm was applied to the higher grades of the Knight's Cross, one list per grade. The sequential numbers greater than 843 for the Knight's Cross of the Iron Cross with Oak Leaves and 143 for the Knight's Cross of the Iron Cross with Oak Leaves and Swords are unofficial and were assigned by the Association of Knight's Cross Recipients (AKCR) and are therefore denoted in parentheses.

This along with the + (plus) indicates that a higher grade of Knight's Cross was awarded as well.
This along with the * (asterisk) indicates that the Knight's Cross was awarded posthumously.
This along with the ? (question mark) indicates that historian Veit Scherzer has expressed doubt regarding the veracity and formal correctness of the listing.

=== Knight's Cross with Oak Leaves, Swords and Diamonds ===
The Knight's Cross with Oak Leaves, Swords and Diamonds is based on the enactment Reichsgesetzblatt I S. 613 of 28 September 1941 to reward those servicemen who had already been awarded the Oak Leaves with Swords to the Knight's Cross of the Iron Cross. Ultimately, it would be awarded to twenty-seven German soldiers, sailors and airmen, ranging from young fighter pilots to field marshals. One recipient was a member of the Fallschirmjäger.

Number	Name	Rank	Role and unit (Note: For an explanation of the various naming schemes used by the Luftwaffe, Heer, Kriegsmarine and Waffen-SS refer to nomenclature used by the Wehrmacht and Waffen-SS.)	Date of award	Image
20	Hermann-Bernhard Ramcke	Generalleutnant (Note: According to Scherzer as General der Fallschirmtruppe.)	Commander of fortress Brest	19 September 1944	Upper body of a man wearing a military uniform with an Iron Cross displayed at the front of his uniform collar.

=== Knight's Cross with Oak Leaves and Swords ===
The Knight's Cross with Oak Leaves and Swords is also based on the enactment Reichsgesetzblatt I S. 613 of 28 September 1941 to reward those servicemen who had already been awarded the Oak Leaves to the Knight's Cross of the Iron Cross. The sequential numbers greater than 143 are unofficial and were assigned by the Association of Knight's Cross Recipients (AKCR) and therefore denoted in brackets. The number of the 160 Sword recipients, including seven Falschirmjäger listed here, is based on the analysis and acceptance of the order commission of the (AKCR). Author Veit Scherzer has challenged the validity of 13 of these listings, including the Fallschirmjäger Eugen Meindl.

Number	Name	Rank	Role and unit	Date of award	Notes	Image
55	Richard Heidrich	Generalleutnant	Commander of 1. Fallschirmjäger-Division	25 March 1944	—	A man wearing a military uniform with an Iron Cross displayed at the front of his uniform collar.
67	Ludwig Heilmann	Oberst	Commander of Fallschirmjäger-Regiment 3 (Note: According to Scherzer as commander of the III./Fallschirmjäger-Regiment 3.)	15 May 1944	—	A man wearing a military uniform with an Iron Cross displayed at the front of his uniform collar.
96	Hans Kroh	Oberst	Leader of 2. Fallschirmjäger-Division	12 September 1944	—	A man wearing a military uniform with an Iron Cross displayed at the front of his uniform collar.
99	Hermann-Bernhard Ramcke+	Generalleutnant	Commander of fortress Brest	19 September 1944	Awarded 20th Diamonds 19 September 1944	Upper body of a man wearing a military uniform with an Iron Cross displayed at the front of his uniform collar.
112	Karl-Lothar Schulz	Oberst	Leader of 1. Fallschirmjäger-Division	18 November 1944	—	A man wearing a military uniform with an Iron Cross displayed at the front of his uniform collar.
131	Erich Walther	Oberst	Leader of Fallschirm-Panzergrenadier-Division 2 "Hermann Göring"	1 February 1945	—	
(155)	Eugen Meindl? (Note: Eugen Meindl's nomination by the troop was approved by each of his commanding officers. However the nomination contains no final remark on the proceedings. Oberst Nicolaus von Below, Hitler's Luftwaffe adjutant, had sent a teleprinter message to the commanding general of the Fallschirmarmee Generaloberst Kurt Student, requesting a statement for this nomination. The copy of the teleprinter message contains a note: resubmission "23 April 1945". It seems that the statement was never returned. The paperwork was not finalized by the end of the war. The Association of Knight's Cross Recipients (AKCR) claims that the award was presented in accordance with the Dönitz-decree. This is illegal according to the Deutsche Dienststelle (WASt) and lacks legal justification. The sequential number "155" was assigned by the AKCR. Fellgiebel assigned the presentation date. Meindl is mentioned on a list of the Oberbefehlshaber Nordwest for "Nominations and Bestowal of War Awards" from May 1945. This list, which was intended to be presented to Karl Dönitz, contained twelve names of pending nominations which had been submitted via the chain of command. Dönitz has never signed this list, most likely he has never even seen this list. The responsible personnel offices awarded or declined eight nominations from this list by the end of the war by, two remained unprocessed by the Heerespersonalamt (HPA—Personnel Office) and Luftwaffenpersonalamt (LPA — Luftwaffe Personnel Office) and two further were left ready for signing at the Oberkommando der Wehrmacht/Wehrmacht-Führungsstab (OKW/WFSt—Oberkommando der Wehrmacht/Wehrmacht-Führungsstab—leadership staff of the Army High Command).)	General der Fallschirmtruppe	Commanding general of II. Fallschirm-Korps	8 May 1945	—	A man wearing a military uniform with an Iron Cross displayed at the front of his uniform collar.

=== Knight's Cross with Oak Leaves ===
The Knight's Cross with Oak Leaves was based on the enactment Reichsgesetzblatt I S. 849 of 3 June 1940. The last officially announced number for the Oak Leaves was 843.

Number	Name	Rank	Role and unit	Date of award	Notes	Image
145	Hermann-Bernhard Ramcke+	Generalmajor	Commander of Fallschirmjäger-Brigade "Ramcke"	13 November 1942	Awarded 99th Swords 19 September 1944; 20th Diamonds 19 September 1944	Upper body of a man wearing a military uniform with an Iron Cross displayed at the front of his uniform collar.
305	Kurt Student	General der Flieger (Note: According to Scherzer as General der Fallschirmtruppe.)	Commanding general of the XI. Fliegerkorps (Luft-lande-Korps)	27 September 1943	—	Black-and-white picture of a man with peaked cap, military uniform displaying various military decorations.
382	Richard Heidrich+	Generalleutnant	Commander of the 1. Fallschirmjäger-Division	5 February 1944	Awarded 55th Swords 25 March 1944	A man wearing a military uniform with an Iron Cross displayed at the front of his uniform collar.
411	Erich Walther+	Oberst	Commander of Fallschirmjäger-Regiment 4	2 March 1944	Awarded 131st Swords 1 February 1945	
412	Ludwig Heilmann+	Oberst	Commander of Fallschirmjäger-Regiment 3	2 March 1944	Awarded 67th Swords 15 May 1944	A man wearing a military uniform with an Iron Cross displayed at the front of his uniform collar.
443	Hans Kroh+	Oberstleutnant	Commander of Fallschirmjäger-Regiment 2	6 April 1944	Awarded 96th Swords 12 September 1944	A man wearing a military uniform with an Iron Cross displayed at the front of his uniform collar.
459	Karl-Lothar Schulz+	Oberst	Commander of Fallschirmjäger-Regiment 1	20 April 1944	Awarded 112th Swords 18 November 1944	A man wearing a military uniform with an Iron Cross displayed at the front of his uniform collar.
510	Reinhard Egger	Oberstleutnant	Leader of Fallschirmjäger-Regiment 4	24 June 1944	—	A man wearing a military uniform with an Iron Cross displayed at the front of his uniform collar.
564	Eugen Meindl+	General der Fallschirmtruppe	Commanding general of the II. Fallschirmkorps	31 August 1944	Awarded (155th) Swords 8 May 1945?	A man wearing a military uniform with an Iron Cross displayed at the front of his uniform collar.
584	Erich Pietzonka	Oberst	Commander of Fallschirmjäger-Regiment 7	16 September 1944	—	A man wearing a military uniform with an Iron Cross displayed at the front of his uniform collar.
585	Walter Gericke	Major	Commander of Fallschirmjäger-Regiment 11	17 September 1944	—	A man wearing a military uniform with an Iron Cross displayed at the front of his uniform collar.
586	Heinrich Trettner	Generalmajor	Commander of the 4. Fallschirmjäger-Division	17 September 1944	—	A man wearing a military uniform with an Iron Cross displayed at the front of his uniform collar.
617	Dr. jur. Dr. rer. pol. Friedrich-August Freiherr von der Heydte (Note: In German a Doctor of Law is abbreviated as Dr. iur. (Doctor iuris) or Dr. jur. (Doctor juris) and a Doctorate of Economics is abbreviated as Dr. rer. pol. (Doctor rerum politicarum).)	Oberstleutnant	Commander of Fallschirmjäger-Regiment 6	30 September 1944	—	A man wearing a military uniform with an Iron Cross displayed at the front of his uniform collar.
654	Heinz Meyer	Hauptmann of the Reserves (Note: According to Scherzer as Hauptmann (War Officer).)	Leader of the III./Fallschirmjäger-Regiment 15	18 November 1944	—	A man wearing a military uniform with an Iron Cross displayed at the front of his uniform collar.
657	Gerhart Schirmer	Oberstleutnant	Commander of Fallschirmjäger-Regiment 16	18 November 1944	—	—
662	Rudolf Witzig	Major	Commander of the I./Fallschirm-Pionier-Regiment 21	25 November 1944	—	—
664	Rudolf Rennecke	Major	Leader of Fallschirmjäger-Regiment 1	25 November 1944	—	—
693	Kurt Gröschke	Oberstleutnant	Commander of Fallschirmjäger-Regiment 15	9 January 1945	—	A man wearing a military uniform with an Iron Cross displayed at the front of his uniform collar.
780	Karl-Heinz Becker	Oberstleutnant	Commander of Fallschirmjäger-Regiment 5	12 March 1945	—	A man wearing a military uniform with an Iron Cross displayed at the front of his uniform collar.
(867)	Hermann Plocher? (Note: Hermann Plocher's nomination had been finalized by the Heerespersonalamt (HPA—Army Staff Office) and was ready for signature by the end of the war. According to the Association of Knight's Cross Recipients (AKCR) the award was presented in accordance with the Dönitz-decree. This is illegal according to the Deutsche Dienststelle (WASt) and lacks legal justification. The presentation date was assigned by Fellgiebel. Plocher was a member of the AKCR.)	Generalleutnant	Commander of the 6. Fallschirmjäger-Division	8 May 1945	—	—
(868)	Franz Graßmel? (Note: The original nomination was not retained. The Oberbefehlshaber Nordwest (OB Nordwest—Commander-in-chief North-West) had sent the nomination to the Oberkommando der Luftwaffe/Auszeichnung und Disziplin (OKL/AuD—Air Force High Command/Award and Discipline). The accompanying letter is presented by Franz Thomas, author of Die Ritterkreuzträger der Deutschen Wehrmacht 1939-1945, Teil II Die Ritterkreuzträger der Fallschirmjäger, Osnabrück 1986, page 88. No further information prevailed. A presentation cannot be verified. The Order Commission of the Association of Knight's Cross Recipients (AKCR) processed this case in 1974 and decided: 868th Oak Leaves, 8 May 1945. According to the AKCR the award was presented in accordance with the Dönitz-decree. This is illegal according to the Deutsche Dienststelle (WASt) and lacks legal justification. The sequential number "868" and date were assigned by the AKCR. Franz Graßmel is listed by the OB Nordwest for the "Nomination for the presentation of war awards" in May 1945. This list, which was to be presented to Karl Dönitz, holds 12 names. These nominations had all been submitted by the OB Nordwest via the command chain and must be considered not finalized. Dönitz has never signed this list and most likely has never seen this list. Graßmel was a member of the AKCR.)	Major	Commander of the Fallschirmjäger-Regiment 20	8 May 1945	—	—

=== Knight's Cross of the Iron Cross ===
Knight's Cross of the Iron Cross
Year	Number of presentations	Posthumous presentations
1940	23	0
1941	25	0
1942	3	1
1943	4	0
1944	59	5
1945	18	0

The Knight's Cross of the Iron Cross is based on the enactment Reichsgesetzblatt I S. 1573 of 1 September 1939 Verordnung über die Erneuerung des Eisernen Kreuzes (Regulation of the renewing of the Iron Cross). The distribution of presentations made to Fallschirmjäger is closely linked to the engagements in which they fought. In 1940 the Battle of France (10 May – 25 June 1940) played a predominant role, in 1941 the Battle of Crete (20 May – 1 June 1941), and in 1944 the Battle of Monte Cassino (17 January – 18 May 1944) in Italy and the Allied Invasion of Normandy (6 June 1944 – mid-July 1944) dominated the events for the Fallschirmjäger. The presentations made therefore match these engagements. A total of 23 awards were made in 1940; 25 in 1941; only 3 in 1942 and 4 in 1943; the peak of 59 was reached in 1944, and 18 in 1945, giving a total of 132 recipients.

Number	Name	Rank	Role and unit	Date of award	Notes	Image
1446	Herbert Abratis	Hauptmann	Leader of the II./Fallschirmjäger-Regiment 1	24 October 1944	—	A man wearing a peaked cap and military uniform with an Iron Cross displayed at the front of his uniform collar.
1058	Heinz Paul Adolff	Hauptmann of the Reserves	Leader of Fallschirm-Pionier-Bataillon 1	26 March 1944*	Killed in action 17 July 1943	—
19	Gustav Altmann	Oberleutnant	Leader of Sturmgruppe "Stahl" in the Fallschirmjäger-Sturm Abteilung "Koch"	12 May 1940	—	—
33	Helmut Arpke	Feldwebel	Member of Sturmgruppe "Stahl" in the Fallschirmjäger-Sturm Abteilung "Koch"	13 May 1940	Killed in action 16 January 1942	A man wearing a military uniform with an Iron Cross displayed at the front of his uniform collar.
243	Josef Barmetler	Oberleutnant of the Reserves (Note: According to Scherzer as Oberleutnant (war officer) and chief of the 7./Fallschirmjäger-Sturm-Regiment 1.)	Leader of the 7./Fallschirmjäger-Sturm-Regiment	9 July 1941	Died of wounds 20 February 1945	A man wearing a military uniform, peaked cap, and an Iron Cross displayed at the front of his uniform collar.
240	Karl-Heinz Becker+	Oberleutnant	Chief of the 11./Fallschirmjäger-Regiment 1	9 July 1941	Awarded 780th Oak Leaves 12 March 1945	A man wearing a military uniform with an Iron Cross displayed at the front of his uniform collar.
1488	Erich Beine	Hauptmann	Leader of the I./Fallschirmjäger-Regiment 12 (Note: According to Scherzer Knight's Cross of the Iron Cross on 18 November 1944 as leader of the III./Fallschirmjäger-Sturm-Regiment (12).)	5 September 1944	—	A man wearing a military uniform with an Iron Cross displayed at the front of his uniform collar.
1593	Karl Berger	Leutnant of the Reserves	Company leader in the 10./Fallschirmjäger-Regiment 15	7 February 1945	—	—
1194	Herbert Beyer	Hauptmann	Commander of the I./Fallschirmjäger-Regiment 4	9 June 1944	—	—
1450	Ernst Blauensteiner	Oberstleutnant im Generalstab (in the General Staff)	Chief of the Generalstab II. Fallschirmkorps	29 October 1944	—	—
43	Wolfgang Graf von Blücher(-Fincken)	Leutnant of the Reserves	Zugführer (platoon leader) in the 2./Fallschirmjäger-Regiment 1	24 May 1940	Killed in action 21 May 1941	A man wearing a military uniform, peaked cap, and an Iron Cross displayed at the front of his uniform collar.
1516	Rudolf Boehlein	Oberleutnant	Chief of the 2./Fallschirmjäger-Regiment 4 (Note: According to Scherzer as a company leader in the I./Fallschirmjäger-Regiment 4.)	30 November 1944	—	—
1084	Rudolf Böhmler	Major	Commander of the I./Fallschirmjäger-Regiment 3	26 March 1944	—	—
36	Bruno Bräuer	Oberst	Commander of Fallschjäger-Regiment 1	24 May 1940	—	—
?	Manfred Büttner? (Note: No evidence of the award can be found in the German Federal Archives. Gerhard von Seemen in his second edition of the Die Ritterkreuzträger 1939–1945 from 1976 quotes that Manfred Büttner is listed by Böhmler Fallschirmjäger, 1. Auflage. Walther-Peer Fellgiebel states about Büttner in his book: "Knight's Cross of the Iron Cross recipients exist, who do not have official evidence in the Federal Archives, but are members of the Bundeswehr and claimed to be Knight's Cross recipients. This claim in some cases was investigated by the Militärischer Abschirmdienst (MAD—Military Counterintelligence Service ) and accepted." Büttner was a member of the Association of Knight's Cross Recipients (AKCR).)	Fahnenjunker-Feldwebel	Leader of the 2./Fallschirmjäger-Regiment 26	29 April 1945	—	A man wearing a camouflage military uniform and steel helmet.
1595	Georg le Coutre	Leutnant	Leader of the 10./Fallschirmjäger-Regiment 6	7 February 1945	—	—
21	Egon Delica	Leutnant	Deputy leader of Sturmgruppe "Granit" in the Fallschirmjäger-Sturm-Abteilung "Koch"	12 May 1940	—	
1566	Rudolf Donth	Feldwebel	Leader of the 6./Fallschirmjäger-Regiment 4	14 January 1945	—	
241	Reinhard Egger+	Oberleutnant	Leader of the 10./Fallschirmjäger-Regiment 1	9 July 1941	Awarded 510th Oak Leaves 24 June 1944	
1012	[Dr.] Johann Engelhardt (Note: The brackets around the doctor title [Dr.] denotes that the academic title was attained after the Knight's Cross of the Iron Cross was awarded.)	Oberleutnant	Chief of 8./Fallschirmjäger-Regiment 6	29 February 1944	—	
1600	Dipl.-Ing. Wolfgang Erdmann	Generalleutnant	Commander of the 7. Fallschirmjäger-Division	8 February 1945	—	—
1372	Werner Ewald	Major	Commander of the II./Fallschirmjäger-Regiment 2	12 September 1944 (Note: According to Scherzer on 17 September 1944.)	—	
1192	Ferdinand Foltin	Hauptmann	Commander of the II./Fallschirmjäger-Regiment 3	9 June 1944	—	
1342	Herbert Fries	Gefreiter	Gun leader in the 2./Fallschirm-Panzer-Jagd-Abteilung 1	5 September 1944	—	
1476	Ernst Frömming	Major	Commander of Fallschirm-Pionier-Bataillon 1	18 November 1944	—	
206	Wilhelm Fulda	Leutnant	Zugführer (platoon leader) in the 6./Fallschirmjäger-Regiment 2 (Note: According to Scherzer as Zugführer (platoon leader) in the 6./Fallschirmjäger-Regiment 2 (Gruppe Stein).)	14 June 1941	—	
1396	Robert Gast	Leutnant	Leader of the 9./Fallschirmjäger-Regiment 7	6 October 1944	—	—
198	Alfred Genz	Oberleutnant	Chief of the 1./Fallschirmjäger-Sturm-Regiment (Note: According to Scherzer as chief of the 1./Fallschirmjäger-Sturm-Regiment 1.)	14 June 1941	—	—
201	Walter Gericke+	Hauptmann	Commander of the IV./Fallschirmjäger-Sturm-Regiment (Note: According to Scherzer as commander of the IV./Fallschirmjäger-Sturm-Regiment 1.)	14 June 1941	Awarded 585th Oak Leaves 17 September 1944	
1473	Ernst Germer	Fahnenjunker-Feldwebel	Leader of the bicycle platoon in the Stabskompanie/Fallschirmjäger-Regiment 1	29 October 1944	—	
1369	Siegfried Gerstner	Major	Commander of the II./Fallschirmjäger-Regiment 7	13 September 1944	—	
47	Helmut Görtz	Feldwebel	Zugführer (platoon leader) in the 3./Fallschirmjäger-Regiment 1	24 May 1940 (Note: According to Scherzer on 29 May 1940.)	—	—
1131	Franz Graßmel+	Major	Commander of the III./Fallschirmjäger-Regiment 4	8 April 1944	Awarded (868th) Oak Leaves 8 May 1945?	—
1211	Kurt Gröschke+	Major	Commander of the II./Fallschirmjäger-Regiment 1	9 June 1944	Awarded 693rd Oak Leaves 9 January 1945	
242	Andreas Hagl	Oberleutnant	Zugführer (platoon leader) in the 2./Fallschirmjäger-Regiment 3	9 July 1941	—	A smiling man wearing a military uniform, peaked cap, and an Iron Cross displayed at the front of his uniform collar.
1346	Reino Hamer	Hauptmann	Commander of the I./Fallschirmjäger-Regiment 7	5 September 1944	—	—
1341	Friedrich Hauber	Hauptmann	Commander of the II./Fallschirmjäger-Regiment 12 (Note: According to Scherzer as commander of the II./Fallschirmjäger-Sturm-Regiment (12).)	5 September 1944	—	—
202	Richard Heidrich+	Oberst	Commander of Fallschirmjäger-Regiment 3	14 June 1941	Awarded 382nd Oak Leaves 5 February 1944; 55th Swords 25 March 1944	A man wearing a military uniform with an Iron Cross displayed at the front of his uniform collar.
203	Ludwig Heilmann+	Major	Commander of the III./Fallschirmjäger-Regiment 3	14 June 1941	Awarded 412th Oak Leaves 2 March 1944; 67th Swords 15 May 1944	A man wearing a military uniform with an Iron Cross displayed at the front of his uniform collar.
1388	Erich Hellmann	Leutnant	Leader of the 1./Fallschirmjäger-Regiment 3	6 October 1944 (Note: According to Scherzer on 30 September 1944.)	—	A man wearing a military uniform, field cap and various military decorations.
236	Harry Herrmann	Oberleutnant	Chief of the 5./Fallschirmjäger-Regiment 1	9 July 1941	—	A man wearing a military uniform, peaked cap, and an Iron Cross displayed at the front of his uniform collar.
1370	Max Herzbach	Hauptmann	Chief of the 7./Fallschirmjäger-Regiment 7	13 September 1944	—	A man wearing a military uniform with an Iron Cross displayed at the front of his uniform collar.
235	Dr. jur. Dr. rer. pol. Friedrich-August von der Freiherr von der Heydte+	Hauptmann	Commander of the I./Fallschirmjäger-Regiment 3	9 July 1941	Awarded 617th Oak Leaves 30 September 1944	A man wearing a military uniform with an Iron Cross displayed at the front of his uniform collar.
?	Johannes-Matthias Hönscheid	Oberfeldwebel	Kriegsberichterstatter der Fallschirmtruppe (Note: According to Scherzer on 16 March 1945 as Kriegsberichter der Fallschirmtruppe.)	12 March 1945	—	A man wearing a military uniform, side cap, various military decorations including an Iron Cross displayed at the front of his uniform collar.
?	Eduard Hübner	Hauptmann	Commander of Sturm-Bataillon Fallschirm AOK 1 (Note: According to Scherzer as commander of Sturm-Bataillon of the 1. Fallschirm-Armee.)	17 March 1945	—	Black-and-white photo of a smiling, sitting man in military uniform.
1371	Georg-Rupert Jacob (Note: According to Scherzer name is spelled Georg-Rupert Jakob.)	Oberleutnant	Chief of the 1./Fallschirmjäger-Regiment 7	13 September 1944	—	—
26	Dr. med. Rolf Jäger	Oberarzt (rank equivalent to Oberleutnant)	Troop doctor in the assault group "Beton" of the Fallschirmjäger-Sturm-Abteilung "Koch" (Battle of Fort Eben-Emael)	13 May 1940 (Note: According to Scherzer on 15 May 1940.)	—	—
1195	Siegfried Jamrowski	Oberleutnant	Chief of the 6./Fallschirmjäger-Regiment 3	9 June 1944	—	
289	Wilhelm Kempke	Feldwebel	Group leader in the 1./Fallschirmjäger-Sturm-Regiment (7. Flieger-Division) (Note: According to Scherzer as group leader in the 1./Luftlande-Sturm-Regiment 1.)	21 August 1941	—	—
40	Horst Kerfin	Oberleutnant	Chief of the 11./Fallschirmjäger-Regiment 1 (Note: According to Scherzer as Zugführer (platoon leader) in the 11./Fallschirmjäger-Regiment 1.)	24 May 1940	—	—
1591	Hellmut Kerutt	Major	Commander of Fallschirmjäger-Bataillon "Kerutt" (Note: According to Scherzer as commander of Fallschirmjäger-Bataillon "Kerutt" [augmented I./Fallschirmjäger-Regiment 18 (alt—old)].)	2 February 1945	—	—
1445	Karl Koch	Oberfeldwebel	Zugführer (platoon leader) in the III./Fallschirmjäger-Regiment 15 (Note: According to Scherzer as leader of Sturmzug (assault platoon) of the III./Fallschirmjäger-Regiment 15.)	24 October 1944*	Killed in action 29 July 1944	—
15	Walter Koch	Hauptmann	Commander of Fallschirmjäger-Sturm-Abteilung "Koch" (Note: According to Scherzer as commander of Luftlande-Sturm-Abteilung "Koch".)	10 May 1940	—	A man wearing a military uniform with an Iron Cross displayed at his neck.
1225	Willi Koch	Oberfeldwebel	Zugführer (platoon leader) in the 3./Fallschirmjäger-Regiment 1	9 June 1944	—	—
1172	Rudolf Kratzert	Hauptmann (Note: According to Scherzer as Hauptmann zur Verwendung (for disposition).)	Commander of the III./Fallschirmjäger-Regiment 3	9 June 1944	—	A man wearing a military uniform with an Iron Cross displayed at his neck.
1197	Heinz Krink	Leutnant	Adjutant in the II./Fallschirmjäger-Regiment 3	9 June 1944	—	—
291	Hans Kroh+	Major	Commander of the I./Fallschirmjäger-Regiment 2	21 August 1941	Awarded 443rd Oak Leaves 6 April 1944; 96th Swords 12 September 1944	A man wearing a military uniform with an Iron Cross displayed at the front of his uniform collar.
1028	Martin Kühne	Hauptmann	Commander of the I./Fallschirmjäger-Regiment 2	29 February 1944	—	—
?	Kurt-Ernst Kunkel? (Note: No evidence of the award can be found in the German Federal Archives. The award was unlawfully presented by the commanding general of the I Parachute Corps, General der Fallschirmtruppe Richard Heidrich.)	Leutnant	Company chief in the 2./Fallschirmjäger-Regiment 4	30 April 1945	—	—
1494	Rudolf Kurz	Oberfähnrich	Leader of the 2./Fallschirmjäger-Regiment 12 (Note: According to Scherzer as leader of the 2./Fallschirmjäger-Sturm-Regiment (12).)	18 November 1944	—	A man wearing a military uniform with an Iron Cross displayed at his neck.
1478	Dr. med. habil. Carl Langemeyer	Stabsarzt of the Reserves (Note: According to Scherzer as Stabsarzt.) (rank equivalent to Hauptmann)	Commander of Fallschirm-Sanitäter-Lehr-Abteilung	18 November 1944	—	—
1311	Erich Lepkowski	Leutnant	Leader of the 5./Fallschirmjäger-Regiment 2	8 August 1944	—	—
1575	Walter Liebing	Major	Leader of Fallschirmjäger-Regiment 23	2 February 1945	—	—
1475	Rolf Mager	Hauptmann	Commander of the II./Fallschirmjäger-Regiment 6	31 October 1944	—	A man wearing a peaked cap and military uniform with various military decorations.
?	Hans Marscholek	Oberleutnant	Battery leader in the Fallschirm-Flak-Abteilung 5 (Note: According to Scherzer as battery leader in the 5./Fallschirm-Flak-Abteilung 5.)	31 October 1944	—	—
200	Eugen Meindl+	Generalmajor	Commander of Fallschirmjäger-Sturm-Regiment (Note: According to Scherzer as commander of Luftlande-Sturm-Regiment 1.)	14 June 1941	Awarded 564th Oak Leaves 31 August 1944 (155th) Swords 8 May 1945?	A man wearing a military uniform with an Iron Cross displayed at the front of his uniform collar.
24	Joachim Meißner	Leutnant of the Reserves	Deputy leader of Sturmgruppe "Eisen" (Assault Group "Iron") in Fallschirmjäger-Sturm-Abteilung "Koch" (Note: According to Scherzer as leader of Sturmgruppe "Eisen" (Assault Group "Iron") in Luftlande-Sturm-Abteilung "Koch".)	12 May 1940	—	—
1210	Otto Menges	Oberfeldwebel	Zugführer (platoon leader) in the 6./Fallschirmjäger-Regiment 1	9 June 1944	—	A man wearing a peaked cap and military uniform.
1525	[Dr.] Gerhard Mertins	Hauptmann	Leader of Fallschirm-Pionier-Bataillon 5	6 December 1944	—	—
1132	Heinz Meyer+	Hauptmann of the Reserves (Note: According to Scherzer as Hauptmann (War Officer).)	Chief of the 8./Fallschirmjäger-Regiment 4	8 April 1944	Awarded 654th Oak Leaves 18 November 1944	A man wearing a military uniform with an Iron Cross displayed at the front of his uniform collar.
1552	Dr. jur. Werner Milch	Hauptmann of the Reserves	Commander of Fallschirm-Granatwerfer-Lehr and Versuchs-Bataillon	9 January 1945	—	—
825	Gerd Mischke	Leutnant	Zugführer (platoon leader) in the 2./Fallschirm-MG-Bataillon 1 (Note: According to Scherzer as Zugführer (platoon leader) in the 2./Fallschirm-MG-Bataillon.)	18 May 1943	—	—
1198	Karl Neuhoff	Oberfeldwebel	Shock troops leader in the 6./Fallschirmjäger-Regiment 3	9 June 1944	—	—
294	Dr. med. Heinrich Neumann (Note: In German a Doctor of Medicine is abbreviated as Dr. med. (Doctor medicinae).)	Oberstabsarzt	Troop doctor of the Fallschirmjäger-Sturm-Regiment (Note: According to Scherzer as regimental doctor of Luftlande-Sturm-Regiment 1 at the same time leader of the I./ Luftlande-Sturm-Regiment 1.)	21 August 1941	—	—
428	Heinrich Orth	Oberfeldwebel	Zugführer (platoon leader) in the 4./Fallschirmjäger-Sturm-Regiment (Note: According to Scherzer as Zugführer (platoon leader) in the 4./Luftlande-Sturm-Regiment 1.)	18 March 1942*	Killed in action 10 March 1942	—
?	Gerhard Pade? (Note: No evidence of the award can be found in the German Federal Archives. Unlawful presentation of the Knight's Cross of the Iron Cross to Gerhard Pade by the commanding general of the I Parachute Corps General der Fallschirmtruppe Richard Heidrich.)	Major	Commander of the I./Fallschirmjäger-Regiment 4	30 April 1945	—	—
1483	Hugo Paul	Hauptmann	Leader of Fallschirmjäger-Bataillon Paul (Note: According to Scherzer as leader of Fallschirmjäger-Bataillon Paul (under control of the 334. Infanterie-Division).)	18 November 1944	—	—
1449	Herbert Peitsch	Gefreiter	Rifle grenade launcher in the 7./Fallschirmjäger-Regiment 6 (Note: According to Scherzer as shooter in the 7./Fallschirmjäger-Regiment 6.)	29 October 1944*	Died of wounds 30 July 1944	—
1345	Erich Pietzonka+	Oberstleutnant	Commander of Fallschirmjäger-Regiment 7	5 September 1944	Awarded 584th Oak Leaves 16 September 1944	A man wearing a military uniform with an Iron Cross displayed at the front of his uniform collar.
37	Fritz Prager	Hauptmann	Commander of the II./Fallschirmjäger-Regiment 1	24 May 1940	—	—
292	Hermann-Bernhard Ramcke+	Oberst (Note: According to Scherzer as Generalmajor and commander of the Ergänzenden Einheiten und Schulen des XI. Fliegerkorps (auxiliary units and schools of the 11th Air Corps) and leader of the Luftlande-Sturm-Regiment 1.)	Commander of Fallschirmjäger-Sturm-Regiment	21 August 1941	Awarded 145th Oak Leaves 13 November 1942; 99th Swords 19 September 1944; 20th Diamonds 19 September 1944	Upper body of a man wearing a military uniform with an Iron Cross displayed at the front of his uniform collar.
1236	Siegfried Rammelt	Leutnant	Pioneer Zugführer (platoon leader) in the Stabskompanie/Fallschirmjäger-Regiment 3 (Note: According to Scherzer on 11 June 1944 as leader of the regimental pioneer platoon in Fallschirmjäger-Regiment 3.)	9 June 1944*	Killed in action 21 March 1944	—
818	[Dr.] Ernst-Wilhelm Rapräger	Oberleutnant	Kampfgruppen leader in Luftwaffen-Regiment "Barenthin" (Note: According to Scherzer as leader of a Kampfgruppe in the III./Luftwaffen-Regiment "Barenthin".)	10 May 1943	—	—
1368	Adolf Reininghaus	Oberfeldwebel	Zugführer (platoon leader) in the 14./Fallschirmjäger-Regiment 7	13 September 1944	—	—
?	Paul-Ernst Renisch	Hauptmann	Commander of the III./Fallschirmjäger-Regiment 1	31 October 1944	—	—
1193	Rudolf Rennecke+	Hauptmann	Leader of the II./Fallschirmjäger-Regiment 3	9 June 1944	Awarded 664th Oak Leaves 25 November 1944	—
25	Helmut Ringler	Leutnant (Note: According to Scherzer as Leutnant of the Reserves.)	Heavy machine gun demi Zugführer (platoon leader) in the Sturmgruppe "Stahl" in the Fallschirm-Sturm-Abteilung "Koch"	15 May 1940	—	—
237	Arnold von Roon	Oberleutnant	Chief of the 3./Fallschirmjäger-Regiment 2	9 July 1941	—	The head of a young man, shown in semi-profile. He wears a peaked cap, a military uniform with a military decoration in shape of an iron cross displayed at the front of his shirt collar.
1618	Walter Sander	Leutnant of the Reserves	Leader of the 1./Fallschirm-Pionier-Bataillon 5	28 February 1945	—	—
418	[Dr.] Bruno Sassen	Feldwebel	Zugführer (platoon leader) in the 10./Fallschirmjäger-Regiment 3	22 February 1942	—	A man wearing a camouflage military uniform, steel helmet and a neck order in the shape of a cross.
22	Gerhard Schacht	Leutnant	Leader Sturmgruppe "Beton" (assault group concrete) in the Fallschirmjäger-Sturmabteilung "Koch" (Note: According to Scherzer as leader Sturmgruppe "Beton" (assault group concrete) in the Luftlande-Sturmabteilung "Koch".)	12 May 1940	—	—
23	Martin Schächter	Leutnant	Leader Sturmgruppe "Eisen" (assault group iron) in the Fallschirmjäger-Sturmabteilung "Koch" (Note: According to Scherzer as leader Sturmgruppe "Eisen" (assault group iron) in the Luftlande-Sturmabteilung "Koch".)	12 May 1940	—	—
1395	Dipl.-Ing. Richard Schimpf	Generalleutnant	Commander of the 3. Fallschirmjäger-Division	6 October 1944	—	—
1344	Horst Schimpke	Leutnant	Zugführer (platoon leader) in the 1./Fallschirm-Panzer-Jäger-Abteilung 1	5 September 1944	—	—
204	Gerhart Schirmer+	Hauptmann	Leader of the II./Fallschirmjäger-Regiment 2 (Note: According to Scherzer as chief of the II./Fallschirmjäger-Regiment 2.)	14 June 1941	Awarded 657th Oak Leaves 18 November 1944	—
1237	Alfred Schlemm	General der Fallschirmtruppe	Commanding general of the I. Fallschirmkorps	11 June 1944	—	
51	Herbert Schmidt	Oberleutnant	Chief of the 1./Fallschirmjäger-Regiment 1	24 May 1940 (Note: According to Scherzer on 29 May 1940.)	—	A man wearing a military uniform with an Iron Cross displayed at the front of his uniform collar.
?	Leonhard Schmidt? (Note: No evidence of the award can be found in the German Federal Archives. The award was unlawfully presented by the commanding general of the I Parachute Corps, General der Fallschirmtruppe Richard Heidrich.)	Hauptmann	Battalion leader in the II./Fallschirmjäger-Regiment 4	30 April 1945	—	—
1103	Werner Schmidt	Major	Commander of Fallschirm-MG-Bataillon 1	5 April 1944	—	—
848	Wolf-Werner Graf von der Schulenburg	Major	Commander of the I./Fallschirmjäger-Regiment 1	20 June 1943	—	—
38	Karl-Lothar Schulz+	Hauptmann	Commander of the III./Fallschirmjäger-Regiment 1	24 May 1940	Awarded 459th Oak Leaves 20 April 1944; 112th Swords 18 November 1944	A man wearing a military uniform with an Iron Cross displayed at the front of his uniform collar.
290	Erich Schuster	Feldwebel	Group leader in the 3./Fallschirmjäger-Sturm-Regiment (Note: According to Scherzer as group leader in the 3./Luftlande-Sturm-Regiment 1.)	21 August 1941	—	—
45	Alfred Schwarzmann	Oberleutnant	Zugführer (platoon leader) in the 8./Fallschirmjäger-Regiment 1	24 May 1940 (Note: According to Scherzer on 29 May 1940.)	—	
1385	Günther Sempert	Hauptmann	Chief of the 5./Fallschirm-Panzer-Jäger-Abteilung 1 (Note: According to Scherzer as leader of Fallschirm-Panzer-Jäger-Abteilung 1.)	30 September 1944	—	A smiling man wearing a peaked cap, military uniform with an Iron Cross displayed at the front of his uniform collar.
1444	Hubert Sniers	Leutnant	Leader of the 9./Fallschirmjäger-Regiment 15 (Note: According to Scherzer as leader of the III./Fallschirmjäger-Regiment 15.)	24 October 1944	—	—
?	Albert Stecken	Major im Generalstab (in the General Staff)	Ia (operations officer) of the 8. Fallschirmjäger-Division	28 April 1945	—	—
239	Edgar Stentzler	Major	Commander of the II./Fallschirmjäger-Sturm-Regiment (Note: According to Scherzer as commander of the II./Fallschirmjäger-Sturm-Regiment 1.)	9 July 1941	—	—
1404	Kurt Stephani	Major of the Reserves	Leader of Fallschirmjäger-Regiment 9 (Note: According to Scherzer as commander of Fallschirmjäger-Regiment 9.)	30 September 1944*	Died of wounds 20 August 1944	—
819	Günther Straehler-Pohl	Hauptmann	Commander of the II./Fallschirmjäger-Regiment 3 (Note: According to Scherzer as commander of the I./Fallschirmjäger-Regiment 3.)	10 May 1943	—	—
18	Kurt Student+	Generalleutnant	Commander of the 7. Flieger-Division (Note: According to Scherzer as commander of the 7. Flieger-Division (Fallschirmjäger).)	12 May 1940	Awarded 305th Oak Leaves 27 September 1943	Black-and-white picture of a man with peaked cap, military uniform displaying various military decorations.
234	Alfred Sturm	Oberst	Commander of Fallschirmjäger-Regiment 2	9 July 1941	—	A man in semi profile wearing a peaked cap and military uniform with various military decorations.
1110	Karl Tannert	Hauptmann	Commander of the III./Fallschirmjäger-Regiment 2	5 April 1944	—	—
205	Hans Teusen	Leutnant	Zugführer (platoon leader) in the 6./Fallschirmjäger-Regiment 2	14 June 1941	—	—
46	[Dr.] Cord Tietjen	Leutnant	Zugführer (platoon leader) in the 5./Fallschirmjäger-Regiment 1	24 May 1940 (Note: According to Scherzer on 29 May 1940.)	—	—
1392	Erich Timm	Major	Commander of Fallschirmjäger-Regiment 12 (Note: According to Scherzer as commander of Fallschirmjäger-Sturm-Regiment (12).)	3 October 1944	—	—
119	Rudolf Toschka	Oberleutnant	Zugführer (platoon leader) in the 1./Fallschirmjäger-Sturm-Regiment 1 (Note: According to Scherzer as Zugführer (platoon leader) in the 1./Luftlande-Sturm-Regiment 1.)	14 June 1941	—	
238	Horst Trebes	Oberleutnant	Leader of the III./Fallschirmjäger-Sturm-Regiment (Note: According to Scherzer as leader of the III./Fallschirmjäger-Sturm-Regiment 1.)	9 July 1941	—	
41	Heinrich Trettner+	Major im Generalstab (in the General Staff)	Ia (operations officer) in the 7. Fliegerdivision	24 May 1940	Awarded 586th Oak Leaves 17 September 1944	
5100 (Note: Although a member of the Luftwaffe, Herbert Trotz was nominated by the Army for the Knight's Cross of the Iron Cross. Consequently, his nomination number is taken from the Army.)	Herbert Trotz	Hauptmann	Commander of the Festungs-Bataillon "Trotz" in the fortress Breslau (commander of the II./Fallschirmjäger-Regiment 26) (Note: According to Scherzer as commander of the Festungs-Grenadier-Bataillon "Trotz" in the fortress Breslau.)	30 April 1945	—	—
1470	Alexander Uhlig	Oberfeldwebel of the Reserves	Zugführer (platoon leader) in the 16./Fallschirmjäger-Regiment 6	29 October 1944	—	—
1387	Kurt Veth	Hauptmann (Note: According to Scherzer as Hauptmann of the Reserves.)	Commander of the II./Fallschirmjäger-Regiment 3	30 September 1944	—	—
?	Viktor Vitali? (Note: No evidence of the award can be found in the German Federal Archives. The award was unlawfully presented by the commanding general of the I. Falschirmkorps, General der Fallschirmtruppe Richard Heidrich.)	Leutnant	Zugführer (platoon leader) in the 5./Fallschirmjäger-Regiment 4	30 April 1945	—	—
402	Helmut Wagner	Leutnant	Zugführer (platoon leader) in the 6./Fallschirmjäger-Regiment 1	24 January 1942	—	—
39	Erich Walther+	Major	Commander of the I./Fallschirmjäger-Regiment 1	24 May 1940	Awarded 411th Oak Leaves 2 March 1944; 131st Swords 1 February 1945	
1430	Friedrich-Wilhelm Wangerin	Hauptmann	Commander of the III./Fallschirmjäger-Regiment 16 -Ost- (Note: According to Scherzer as commander of the III./Fallschirmjäger-Regiment 16.)	24 October 1944	—	—
?	Hans-Joachim Weck? (Note: No evidence of the award can be found in the German Federal Archives. Unlawful presentation of the Knight's Cross of the Iron Cross by the commanding general of the I. Fallschirmkorps, General der Fallschirmtruppe Richard Heidrich. Hans-Joachim Weck was a member of the Association of Knight's Cross Recipients.)	Leutnant	Leader of the 3./Fallschirmjäger-Regiment 4	30 April 1945	—	—
293	Heinrich Welskop	Oberfeldwebel	Zugführer (platoon leader) in the 11./Fallschirmjäger-Regiment 3	21 August 1941	—	—
1199	Walter Werner	Feldwebel	Group leader in the 1./Fallschirm-Pionier-Bataillon 1	9 June 1944	—	—
993	Hans-Karl Wittig	Feldwebel	Leader of the 11./Fallschirmjäger-Regiment 1	5 February 1944	—	—
16	Rudolf Witzig+	Oberleutnant	Leader of Sturmgruppe "Granit" in the Fallschirmjäger-Sturm-Abteilung "Koch"	10 May 1940	Awarded 662nd Oak Leaves 25 November 1944	—
1196	Hilmar Zahn	Oberleutnant	Chief of the 5./Fallschirmjäger-Regiment 1	9 June 1944	—	—
27	Otto Zierach	Oberleutnant (Note: According to Scherzer as Oberleutnant of the Reserves and Ia (operations officer) of the Luftlande-Sturm-Abteilung "Koch".)	Glider pilot in the Fallschirmjäger-Sturm-Abteilung "Koch"	15 May 1940	At the same time promoted to Hauptmann	—
