= Battle of Fort Ében-Émael =

Battle (WW2)

- Part of the Battle of Belgium in the Second World War
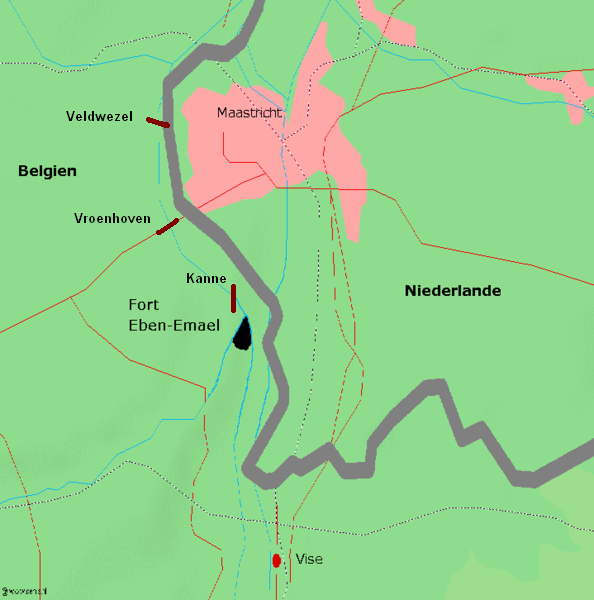
- Map of the area between Belgium and the Netherlands near Fort Ében-Émael
Date	10–11 May 1940
Location	Fort Ében-Émael, on the Dutch-Belgian border, near the Dutch city of Maastricht. 50°47′50″N 5°40′51″E
Result	German victory

Belligerents
Germany	Belgium

Commanders and leaders
(Nazi Germany) Walter Koch	(Belgium) Jean Jottrand (POW)

Strength
493	1,200+ (estimated)

Casualties and losses
6 killed 20 wounded	100 killed or wounded 1,000+ captured (Note: This figure only refers to casualties and prisoners at Fort Ében-Émael. Belgian casualties taken during fighting at the three bridges is unknown.)

The Battle of Fort Ében-Émael was a battle between Belgian and German forces that took place between 10 May and 11 May 1940, and was part of the Battle of Belgium and Fall Gelb, the German invasion of the Low Countries and France. An assault force of German paratroopers, Fallschirmjäger, was tasked with assaulting and suppressing Fort Ében-Émael, a Belgian fortress whose strategic position and strong artillery emplacements dominated several important bridges over the Albert Canal. These carried roads which led into the Belgian heartland and were what the Wehrmacht intended to use to advance. As some of the German airborne forces assaulted the fortress and disabled the north pointed artillery pieces inside it, others simultaneously captured two bridges over the canal.

Having disabled the fortress, the airborne troops were then ordered to protect the bridges against Belgian counter-attacks until they linked up with ground forces from the German 18th Army.

The battle was a strategic victory for the Wehrmacht, with the airborne troops landing on top of the fortress with gliders and using new models of explosives and flamethrowers to disable the outer defences of the fortress. The Fallschirmjäger then entered some casemates killing some defenders and containing the rest in the lower sections of the fortress. Simultaneously, the rest of the German assault force had landed near the three bridges over the canal, destroyed several pillboxes and defensive positions and defeated the Belgian forces guarding the bridges, capturing them and bringing them under German control. The airborne troops suffered heavy casualties during the operation, but succeeded in holding two of the bridges until the arrival of German ground forces. German forces were then able to use two bridges over the canal (one near Riemst and one near Veldwezelt) to bypass Belgian defensive positions and advance into Belgium to invade it. The bridge at Kanne was destroyed; Wehrmacht engineers constructed a temporary bridge.

== Background ==
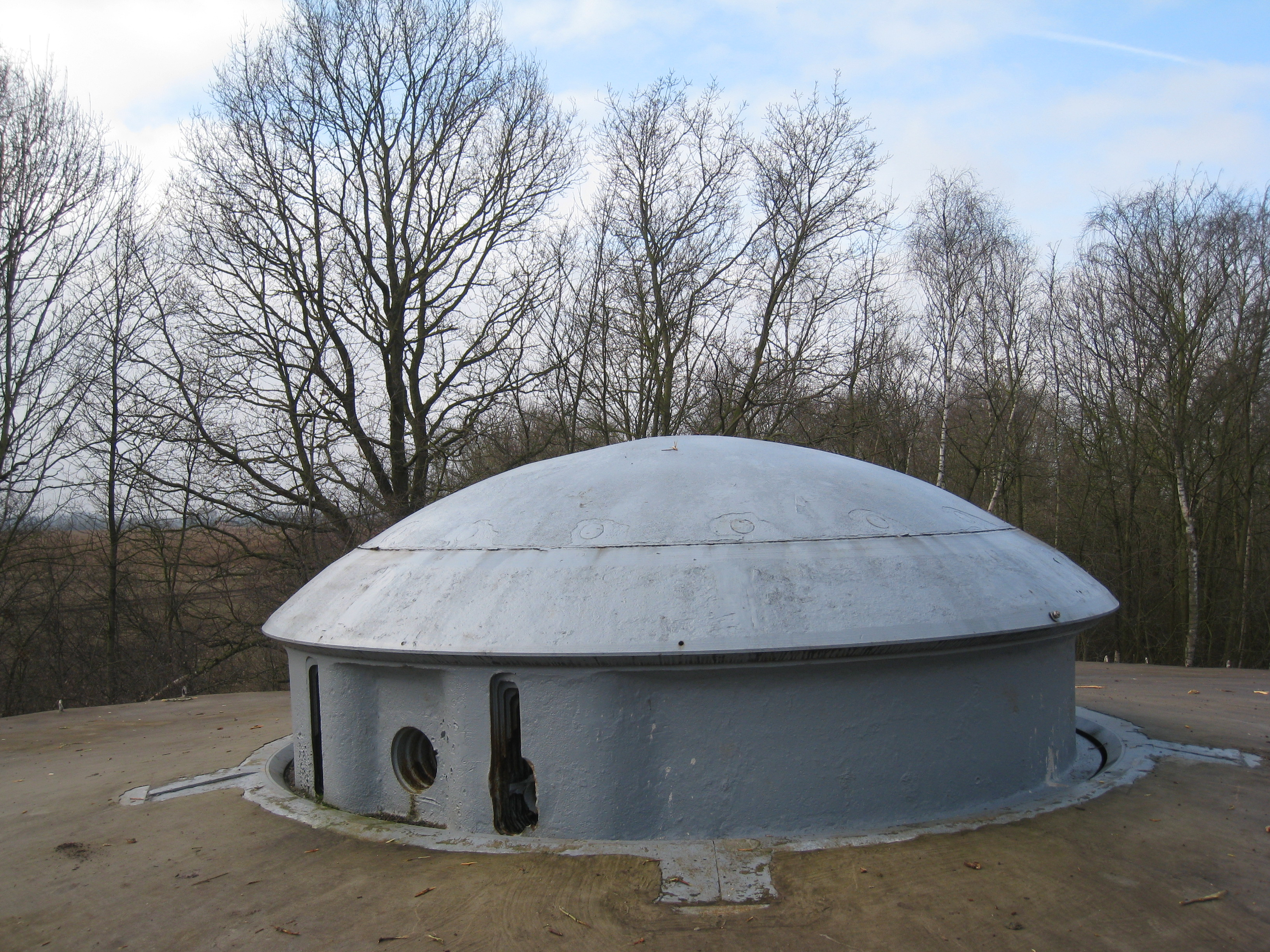
A retractable gun turret at Fort Ében-Émael

On 10 May 1940, Germany launched Fall Gelb ("Plan Yellow"), the invasion of the Low Countries and France. By attacking through the Netherlands, Luxembourg, and Belgium, the German Oberkommando der Wehrmacht planned to outflank the Maginot Line, and advance through southern Belgium and into northern France, cutting off the British Expeditionary Force and a large part of the French forces and forcing the French government to surrender. To gain access to northern France, German forces would have to defeat the armed forces of the Low Countries and either bypass or neutralize several defensive positions, primarily in Belgium and the Netherlands. Some of these defensive positions in NL were only lightly defended and intended more as delaying positions than true defensive lines designed to stop an enemy attack.

Some defences were of a more permanent nature, possessed considerable fortifications and were garrisoned by significant numbers of troops. The Grebbe Line and the Peel Line in the Netherlands, which stretched from the southern shore of the Zuiderzee to the Belgian border near Weert, had many fortifications combined with natural obstacles, such as marsh-lands and the Geld Valley, which could easily be flooded to impede an attack. The main Belgian defensive line, the K-W Line (also known as the Dyle or Dijle Line), along the river Dyle, protected the port of Antwerp and the Belgian capital, Brussels. Between the K-W Line and the border was a delaying line along the Albert Canal. This delaying line was protected by forward positions manned by troops, except in a single area where the canal ran close to the Dutch border, which was known as the "Maastricht Appendix" due to the proximity of the Dutch city of Maastricht. There the Belgian military could not build forward positions due to the proximity of the border, and instead assigned an infantry division to guard the three bridges over the canal in the area, a brigade being assigned to each bridge. The bridges were defended by blockhouses equipped with machine-guns. Artillery support was provided by Fort Ében-Émael, whose artillery pieces covered two of the bridges.

The German High Command became aware of the defensive plan, which called for Belgian forces to briefly hold the delaying positions along the Albert Canal and then retreat to link up with British and French forces on the K-W Line. The Germans developed a strategy that would disrupt this plan, by seizing the three bridges in the "Maastricht Appendix", as well as other bridges in Belgium and the Netherlands. This would allow their Wehrmacht forces to breach the defensive positions and advance into Belgium.

== Prelude ==
=== Belgian preparations ===
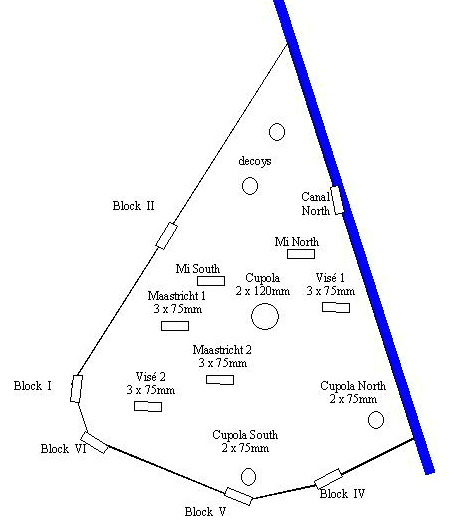
Map of Fort Ében-Émael

The Belgian 7th Infantry Division was assigned to guard the three bridges over the canal, supplementing the troops who garrisoned Fort Ében-Émael at the time of the battle. (Note: There appears to be some debate over the number of troops garrisoning the Fort at the time of the battle. Lucas, writes that "The Belgian garrison was said to number 2,000 men," while Harclerode and Lucas, give lower figures of 1,185 and 1,200 respectively.) The defences for each bridge consisted of four large concrete pillboxes on the western side of the canal, three equipped with machine-guns and a fourth with an anti-tank gun; the bunker containing the anti-tank gun was positioned close to the road leading from the bridge, with one machinegun-equipped bunker immediately behind the bridge and two others flanking the bridge a short distance either side. A company position existed on the western bank of the canal by each of the bridges, with a small observation post on the eastern side, which could be quickly recalled, and all three bridges could be destroyed with demolition charges set into their structures, triggered by a firing mechanism situated in the anti-tank bunkers.

Fort Ében-Émael, which measured 800 by 1,000 yards (730 by 910 m), had been built between 1932 and 1935, by digging the required space out of marl. It possessed walls and roofs composed of 14-foot (4.3 m) thick reinforced concrete, as well as four retractable casemates and seventeen strongpoints.The fort was equipped with two 120mm artillery pieces with a range of ten miles which could traverse 360 degrees; sixteen 75mm artillery pieces; twelve 60mm high-velocity anti-tank guns; twenty-five twin-mounted machine-guns; and four anti-aircraft machineguns. One side of the fort faced the canal, whilst the other three faced land and were defended; deep ditches; a 20 feet (6.1 m) high wall; concrete pillboxes fitted with machine-guns; fifteen searchlights were emplaced across the fort; and 60mm anti-tank guns. Many tunnels ran beneath the fort, connecting individual bunkers to the command centre and the ammunition stores. The fort also possessed its own hospital and living quarters for the garrison, as well as a power station that provided electricity to power the guns, provide internal and external illumination, and to power the wireless network and air-purifying system used by the garrison.

Belgian plans did not call for the garrison of the fort and the attached defending forces to fight a sustained battle against an attacking force; it was assumed that sufficient warning of an attack would be given so that the detachment on the eastern side of the canal could be withdrawn, the bridges destroyed and the garrison ready to fight a delaying action. The defending force would then retire to the main defensive positions along the river Dyle, where they would link up with other Allied forces.

=== German preparations ===
The airborne assault on Fort Ében-Émael, and the three bridges it helped protect, was part of a much larger German airborne operation that involved the 7th Air Division and the 22nd Airlanding Division. The 7th Air Division, comprising three parachute regiments and one infantry regiment, was tasked with capturing river and canal bridges that led to the Royal Netherlands Army defensive positions centred around Rotterdam, as well as an airfield at Waalhaven. The 22nd Airlanding Division, which was composed of two infantry regiments and a reinforced parachute battalion, was tasked with capturing airfields in the vicinity of The Hague at Valkenburg, Ockenburg and Ypenburg. Once these airfields had been secured by the parachute battalion, the rest of the division would land with the aim of occupying the Dutch capital of Amsterdam and capturing the entire Dutch government, the Dutch royal family, and high-ranking members of the Netherlands Armed Forces. The division would also interdict all roads and railway lines in the area to impede the movement of Dutch forces. The intention of the German OKW was to use the two airborne divisions to create a corridor, along which the 18th Army could advance into the Netherlands without being impeded by destroyed bridges. General Kurt Student, who proposed the deployment of the two airborne divisions, argued that their presence would hold open the southern approaches to Rotterdam, prevent the movement of Dutch reserves based in north-west Holland and any French Army forces sent to aid the Dutch defenders, and deny the use of airfields to Allied aircraft, all of which would aid a rapid advance by the 18th Army. 400 Junkers Ju 52 transport aircraft would be used to deploy the parachute elements of the airborne troops, as well as transport the elements of the two airborne divisions not landing by parachute or glider.

The force tasked with assaulting the fort and capturing the three bridges was formed from elements of the 7th Air Division and the 22nd Airlanding Division, and was named Sturmabteilung Koch (Assault Detachment Koch) after the leader of the force, Hauptmann Walter Koch. The force, which had been assembled in November 1939, was primarily composed of parachutists from the 1st Parachute Regiment and engineers from the 7th Air Division, as well as a small group of Luftwaffe pilots. Although the force was composed primarily of parachutists, it was decided that the first landings by the force should be by glider. Adolf Hitler, who had taken a personal interest in the arrangements for the assault force, had ordered that gliders be used after being told by his personal pilot, Hanna Reitsch, that gliders in flight were nearly silent; it was believed that, since Belgian anti-aircraft defences used sound-location arrays and not radar, it would be possible to tow gliders near to the Dutch border and then release them, achieving a surprise attack as the Belgian defenders would not be able to detect them. Fifty DFS 230 transport gliders were supplied for use by the assault force, and then a period of intensive training began. A detailed study of the fort, the bridges and the local area was made, and a replica of the area was constructed for the airborne troops to train in. Joint exercises between the parachutists and the glider pilots were carried out in early 1940, and refinements were made to the equipment and tactics to be used, such as barbed wire being added to the nose-skids of the gliders to reduce their landing run, and the airborne troops trained with flamethrowers and specialized shaped charge explosives, who was tested on fortifications in Czechoslovakia similar to Fort Ében-Émael. Secrecy was also maintained in other ways. When exercises were completed gliders and equipment would be broken down and taken away in furniture vans, the sub-units of the force were frequently renamed and moved from one location to another, unit badges and insignia were removed, and the airborne troops were not permitted to leave their barracks or to take leave.

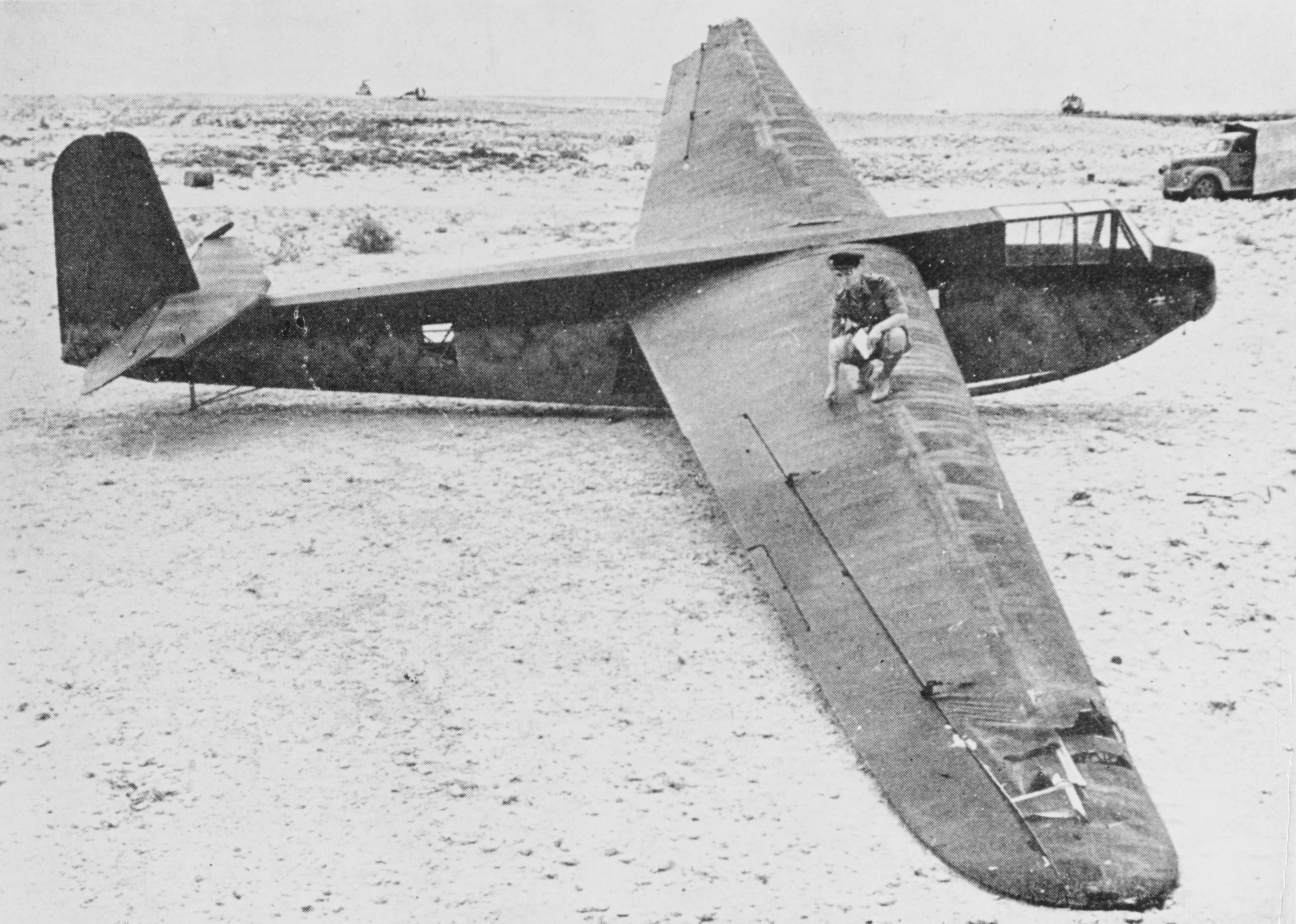
German DFS 230 troop-carrying glider

Hauptmann Koch divided his force into four assault groups. Group Granite, under Oberleutnant Rudolf Witzig, composed of eighty-five men in eleven gliders whose task would be to assault and capture Fort Ében-Émael; Group Steel, commanded by Oberleutnant Gustav Altmann, and formed of ninety-two men and nine gliders, would capture the Veldwezelt bridge; Group Concrete, commanded by Leutnant Gerhard Schacht and composed of ninety-six men in eleven gliders, would capture the Vroenhoven bridge; and Group Iron, under Leutnant Martin Schächter, composed of ninety men in ten gliders, who would capture the Kanne bridge. The crucial element for the assault force, particularly Group Granite, was time. It was believed that the combination of a noiseless approach by the gliders used by the assault force, and the lack of a declaration of war by the German government, would give the attackers the element of surprise. However, German estimates were that this would last, at the most, for sixty minutes, after which the superior numbers of the Belgian forces defending the fort and the bridges, as well as any reinforcements sent to the area, would come to bear against the relatively small number of lightly armed airborne troops. The German plan, therefore, was to eliminate within those sixty minutes as many anti-aircraft positions and individual cupolas and casemates as was possible, and at all costs to put out of action the long-range artillery pieces which covered the three bridges. The destruction of these guns was expected to be completed within ten minutes; within this time the airborne troops would have to break out of their gliders, cover the distance to the guns, fix the explosive charges to the barrels of the guns and detonate them, all while under enemy fire.

The finalized plan for the assault called for between nine and eleven gliders to land on the western bank of the Albert Canal by each of the three bridges just prior to 05:30 on 10 May, the time scheduled for Fall Gelb to begin. The groups assigned to assault the three bridges would overwhelm the defending Belgian troops, remove any demolition charges and then prepare to defend the bridges against an expected counter-attack. Forty minutes later, three Ju 52 transport aircraft would fly over each position, dropping a further twenty-four airborne troops as reinforcements as well as machine-guns and significant amounts of ammunition. Simultaneously, the force assigned to assault Fort Ében-Émael was to land on top of the Fort in eleven gliders, eliminate any defenders attempting to repel them, cripple what artillery they could with explosive charges, and then prevent the Garrison from dislodging them. Having achieved their initial objectives of seizing the bridges and eliminating the long-range artillery pieces possessed by the Fort, the airborne troops would then defend their positions until the arrival of German ground forces.

== Battle ==
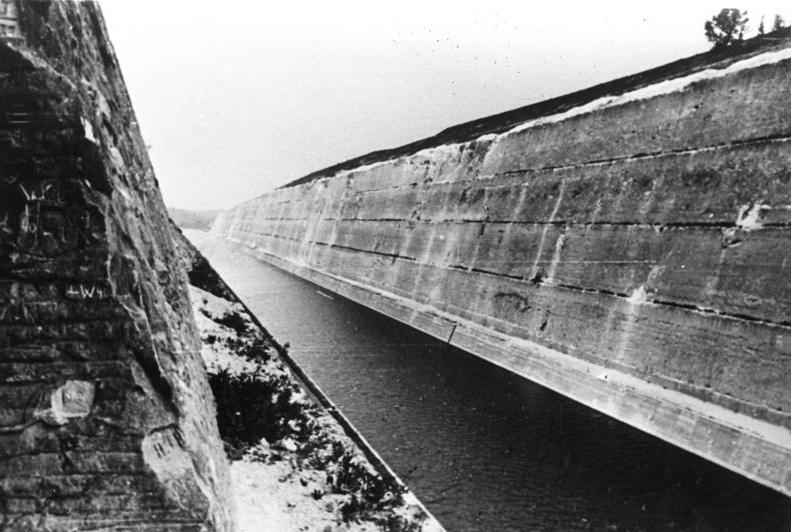
The Albert Canal as seen from a Fort Ében-Émael machine gun position, 23 May 1940

For reasons of security, Sturmabteilung Koch was dispersed around several locations in the Rhineland until it received orders for the operation against Fort Ében-Émael and the three bridges to begin. Preliminary orders were received on 9 May, ordering the separated detachments to move to a pre-arranged concentration area, and shortly afterwards a second order arrived, informing the assault force that Fall Gelb was to begin at 05:25 on 10 May.

The Fallschirmjäger filed onto a non-illuminated tarmac at 03:00, as the loudspeakers played Richard Wagner's "Ride of the Valkyries". At 04:30, forty-two gliders carrying the 493 airborne troops that formed the assault force were lifted off from two airfields in Cologne, the armada of gliders and transport aircraft turning south towards their objectives. The aircraft maintained strict radio silence, forcing the pilots to rely on a chain of signal fires that pointed towards Belgium; the radio silence also ensured that senior commanders of the assault force could not be informed that the tow-ropes on one of the gliders had snapped, forcing the glider to land inside Germany. The pilot of a second glider released his tow-rope prematurely, and was unable to land near its objective. Both gliders were carrying troops assigned to Group Granite and were destined to assault Fort Ében-Émael, thereby leaving the group understrength; it also left it under the command of Oberleutnant Witzig's second-in-command - Oberfeldwebel Helmut Wenzel, as Witzig was in one of the gliders forced to land. The remaining gliders were released from their tow-ropes twenty miles away from their objectives at an altitude of 7,000 feet (2,100 m), which was deemed high enough for the gliders to land by the three bridges and on top of the fort, and also maintain a steep dive angle to further ensure they landed correctly. After the Ju 52's released the gliders and began turning away, Netherlands anti-aircraft artillery positions detected them and opened fire. This alerted the defences in the area to the presence of the enemy planes.

=== Bridges ===
All nine gliders carrying the troops assigned to Group Steel landed next to the bridge at Veldwezelt at 05:20, the barbed-wire wrapped around the landing skids of the gliders succeeding in rapidly bringing them to a halt. The glider belonging to Leutnant Altmann had landed some distance from the bridge, and a second had landed directly in front of a Belgian pillbox, which began engaging both groups of airborne troops with small-arms fire. The non-commissioned officer in charge of the troops from the second glider hurled grenades at the pillbox whilst one of his men laid an explosive charge at the door and detonated it, allowing the bunker to be assaulted and removed as an obstacle. Simultaneously, Altmann gathered his troops and led them along a ditch running parallel to the bridge until two men were able to reach the canal bank and climb onto the girders of the bridge and disconnect the demolition charges placed there by the Belgian garrison. Thus the airborne troops prevented the Belgians from destroying the bridge, though they still faced the rest of the Belgian defenders. The defenders held on until a platoon of German reinforcements arrived and forced them to retire to a nearby village. However, the assaulting force's small-arms fire could not overcome two field-guns located five hundred metres from the bridge, thus forcing Altmann to call for air support. Several Junkers Ju 87 Stukas responded and knocked out the guns. Group Steel was to be relieved by 14:30, but Belgian resistance delayed their arrival in strength until 21:30. During the fighting, the attacking force left eight airborne troops dead and thirty wounded.

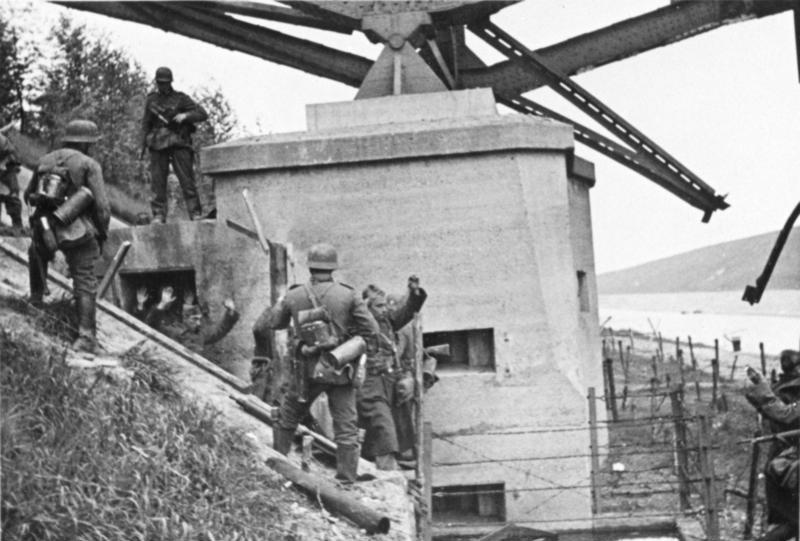
Belgian soldiers surrender to German troops at the bridge at Veldwezelt, 11 May 1940.

Ten of the eleven gliders transporting Group Concrete landed next to the Vroenhoven bridge at 05:15, the eleventh glider having been hit by anti-aircraft fire en route to the bridge and being forced to land prematurely inside Dutch territory. The gliders were engaged by heavy anti-aircraft fire as they landed, causing one of the gliders to stall in mid-air. The resulting crash severely wounded three airborne troops. The rest of the gliders landed without damage. One of the gliders landed near to the fortification housing the bridge detonators. This allowed the airborne troops to rapidly assault the position. They killed the occupants and tore out the wires connecting the explosives to the detonator set, ensuring the bridge could not be destroyed. The remaining Belgian defenders resisted fiercely by mounting several counter-attacks in an attempt to recapture the bridge. They were repelled with the aid of several machine-guns dropped by parachute to the airborne troops at 06:15. Constant Belgian attacks meant that Group Concrete were not withdrawn and relieved by an infantry battalion until 21:40. They suffered losses of seven dead and twenty-four wounded.

All but one of the ten gliders carrying the airborne troops assigned to Group Iron were able to land next to their objective, the bridge at Kanne. Due to a navigation error by the pilots of the transport aircraft towing the gliders, one of the gliders was dropped in the wrong area. The other nine gliders were towed through heavy anti-aircraft fire and landed at 05:28. That was almost 15 Minutes later than the other Bridges. As the gliders began to descend towards their objective, the bridge was destroyed by several demolition explosions set off by the Belgian garrison. Unlike the garrisons of the other two bridges, the Belgian defenders at Kanne had been forewarned trough the commander from Eben Emael, any chance of a surprise assault was lost and gave the defenders sufficient time to destroy the bridge.

As the gliders came in to land, one was hit by anti-aircraft fire and crashed into the ground killing most of the occupants. The remaining eight landed successfully, and the airborne troops stormed the Belgian positions and eliminated the defenders. By 05:50 the airborne troops had secured the area as well as the nearby village of Kanne, but they were then subjected to a strong counter-attack which was only repulsed with the aid of air support from Stuka divebombers. The defenders launched several more counter-attacks during the night, ensuring that the airborne troops could not be relieved until the morning of 11 May. Group Iron suffered the heaviest casualties of all three assault groups assigned to capture the bridges with twenty-two dead and twenty-six wounded. One of the airborne troops assigned to the Group was taken prisoner by the Belgians. He was later freed by German forces at a British prisoner of war camp at Dunkirk.

=== Fort Ében-Émael ===
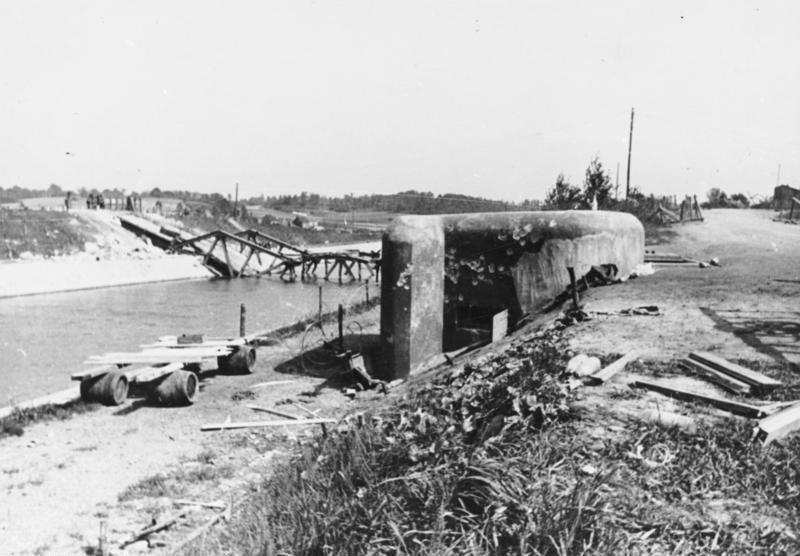
The bridge at Kanne destroyed by the Belgian military, 23 May 1940

The nine remaining gliders transporting the airborne troops assigned to Group Granite successfully landed on the roof of Fort Ében-Émael. The airborne troops rapidly emerged from the gliders, Oberfeldwebel Helmut Wenzel assuming command in the absence of Witzig, and began attaching explosive charges to those emplacements on the top of the Fort which housed the artillery pieces that could target the three bridges in the north. In the southern part of the Fort, Objective No. 18 (maastrich 2), an artillery observation casemate housing three 75mm artillery pieces was damaged with a light demolition charge and then permanently destroyed with a heavier charge, which damaged the casemate's observation dome and part of the roof of the Fort itself. Objective No. 12, a traversing turret holding two more artillery pieces was also destroyed by airborne troops, who then moved to Objective No. 26, a turret holding another three 75mm weapons; although explosives were detonated against this and the airborne troops assigned to destroy it moved off, this proved to be premature as one of the guns was rapidly brought to bear against the attackers, who were forced to assault it for a second time to destroy it. Another pair of 75mm guns in a cupola was disabled, as was a barracks known to house Belgian troops. However, attempts to destroy Objective No. 24 proved to be less successful; the objective, twin turrets with heavy-calibre guns mounted on a rotating cupola, was too large for airborne troops from a single glider to destroy on their own, forcing troops from two gliders to be used. Primitive unlined shaped charges were affixed to the turrets and detonated, but whilst they shook the turrets they did not destroy them, and other airborne troops were forced to climb the turrets and smash the gun barrels.

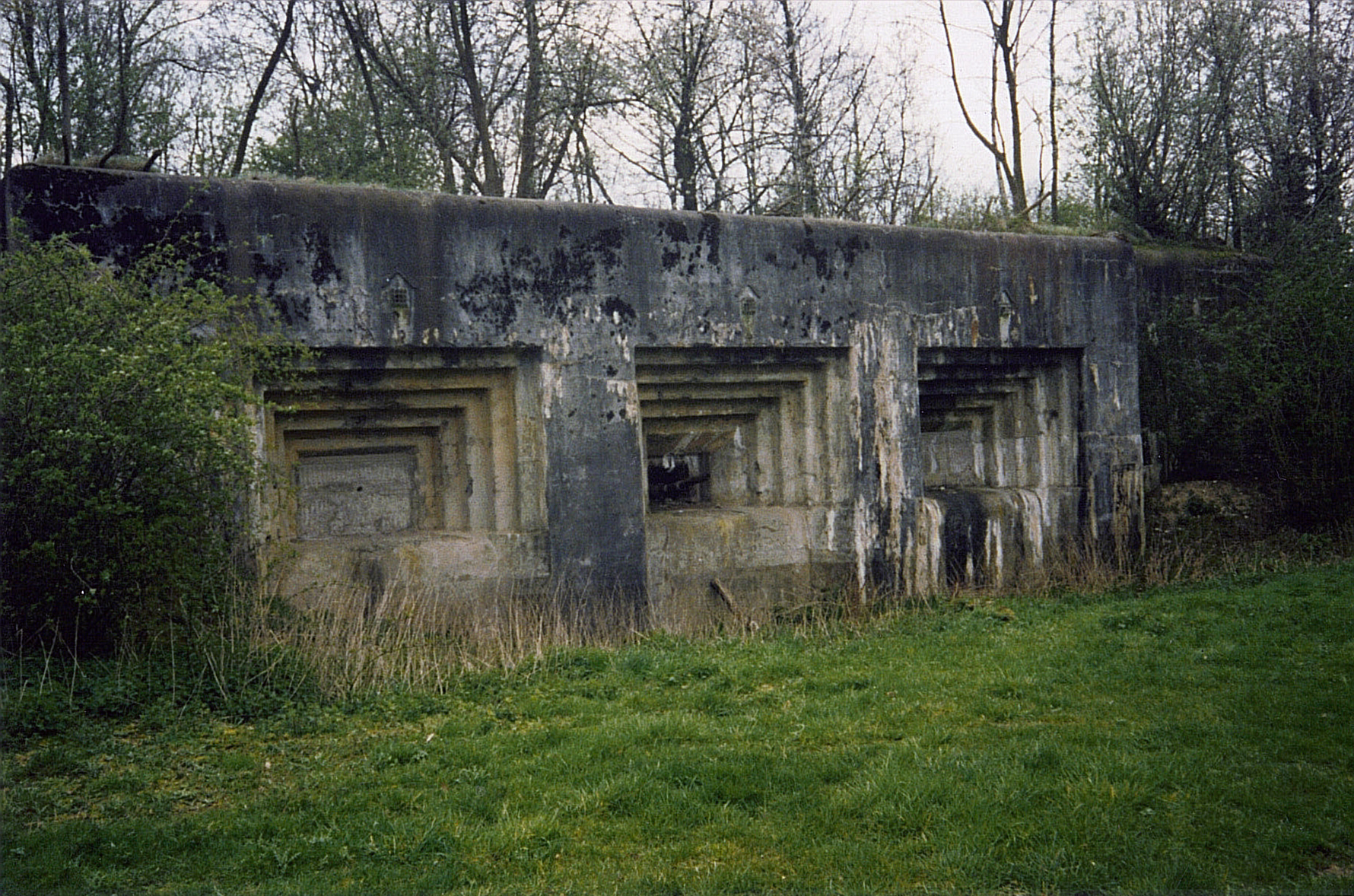
One of the Fort Ében-Émael's casemates, "Maastricht 2"

In the northern section of the fort, similar actions were taking place, as the airborne troops raced to destroy or otherwise disable the fortifications housing artillery pieces. Objective No. 13 was a casemate housing multiple machine-guns whose arcs of fire covered the western side of the Fort; to destroy the casemate, the airborne troops used a flamethrower to force the Belgian soldiers manning the weapons to retreat, and then detonated shaped charges against the fortification to disable it. Another observation cupola fitted with machine-guns, Objective No. 19, was destroyed, but two further objectives, Nos. 15 and 16 were found to be dummy installations. Unexpected complications came from Objective No. 23, a retractable cupola housing two 75mm artillery pieces. It had been assumed that the weapons in this fortification could not stop the airborne assault, but this assumption was found to be false when the weapons opened fire, forcing the airborne troops in the area to go to cover. The rapid fire of the weapons led to air support being summoned, and a Stuka squadron bombed the cupola. Although the bombs did not destroy the cupola, the explosions did force the Belgians to retract it throughout the rest of the fighting. Any exterior entrances and exits located by the airborne troops were destroyed with explosives to seal the garrison inside the Fort, giving the garrison few opportunities to attempt a counter-attack. The airborne troops had achieved their initial objective of destroying or disabling the artillery pieces that the fort could have used to bombard the captured bridges, but they still faced some small cupolas and emplacements that had to be disabled. These included anti-aircraft weapons and machine-guns.

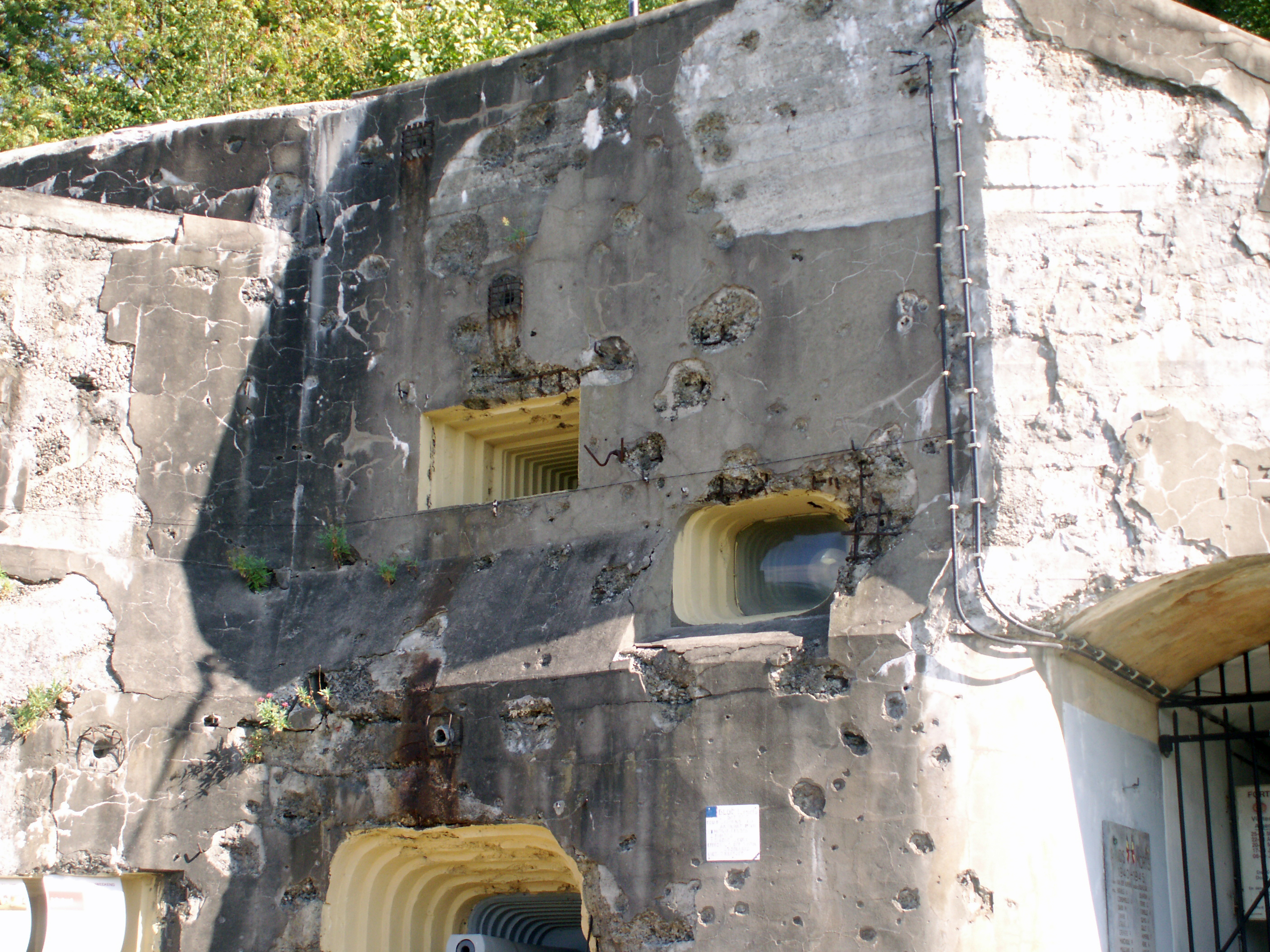
Bullet damage on the fortifications at Ében-Émael

As these secondary objectives were attacked, a single glider landed on top of the Fort, from which emerged Oberleutnant Rudolf Witzig. After his glider had unintentionally landed in German territory, he had radioed for another tug, and it landed in the field with a replacement glider. Once the airborne troops had broken down fences and hedges obstructing the aircraft, they boarded the new glider and were towed through anti-aircraft fire to the fort. Having achieved their primary objectives of disabling the artillery pieces possessed by the fort, the airborne troops then held it against Belgian counter-attacks, which began almost immediately. These counter-attacks were made by Belgian infantry formations without artillery support and were uncoordinated. This allowed the airborne troops to repel them with machine-gun fire. Artillery from several smaller Forts nearby and Belgian field artillery units also targeted the airborne troops, but this too was uncoordinated and achieved nothing and often aided the airborne troops in repelling counter-attacks by Belgian infantry units. Patrols were also used to ensure that the garrison stayed in the interior of the fort and did not attempt to emerge and mount an attempt to retake the fort. Any attempt by the garrison to launch a counter-attack would have been stymied by the fact that the only possible route for such an attack was up a single, spiral staircase, and any embrasures looking out onto the Fort had either been captured or disabled. The plan for the assault had called for Group Granite to be relieved by 51st Engineer Battalion within a few hours of seizing the Fort, but the Group was not actually relieved until 7:00 on 11 May. Heavy Belgian resistance, as well as several demolished bridges over the river Meuse, had forced the battalion to lay down new bridges, delaying it significantly. Once the airborne troops had been relieved, the battalion, in conjunction with an infantry regiment that arrived shortly after the engineers, mounted an attack on the main entrance to the fort. Faced with this attack, the garrison (which had only numbered 750 present out of a regular force of 1,200) surrendered at 12:30, suffering 23 men killed and 59 wounded. The Germans captured more than a thousand Belgian soldiers. Group Granite suffered six killed and nineteen wounded.

== Aftermath ==
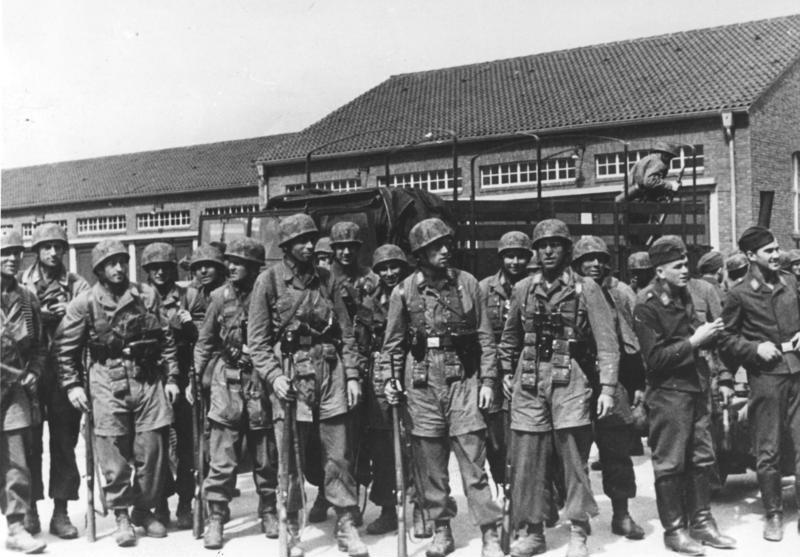
Fallschirmjäger of Sturmabteilung Koch

The airborne assault on the three bridges and Fort Ében-Émael had been a success for the Fallschirmjäger of Sturmabteilung Koch; the artillery pieces possessed by Fort Ében-Émael had been disabled, and two of the three bridges designated to be captured by the sub-units of Sturmabteilung Koch had been captured before they could be destroyed. The capture of the bridges, and the neutralization of the artillery pieces in the Fort allowed infantry and armour from the 18th Army to bypass other Belgian defences and enter the heart of Belgium. In a post-war publication, General Kurt Student wrote of the operation, and the efforts of Group Granite in particular, that "It was a deed of exemplary daring and decisive significance [...] I have studied the history of the last war and the battles on all fronts. But I have not been able to find anything among the host of brilliant actions—undertaken by friend or foe—that could be said to compare with the success achieved by Koch's Assault Group."

The successful completion of the attack despite the designated commander not present in the first and crucial hours is seen as one of the finest examples of Auftragstaktik even in publications of the 21st century.

Hitler personally decorated all the participants of the glider assault. Sturmabteilung Koch was promoted after the end of Fall Gelb to become 1st Battalion of the newly formed 1st Airlanding Assault Regiment, which itself consisted of four battalions of Fallschirmjaeger trained as a gliderborne assault force. Hauptmann Koch was promoted to the rank of Major for his part in the operation and assumed command of the 1st Battalion.

Due to the destroyed bridges, the US 17th Armored Engineer Battalion built a new bridge over the canal on the 15 September 1944.

== See also ==
- List of Belgian military equipment of World War II
- List of German military equipment of World War II
