= Richard Heidrich =

German general

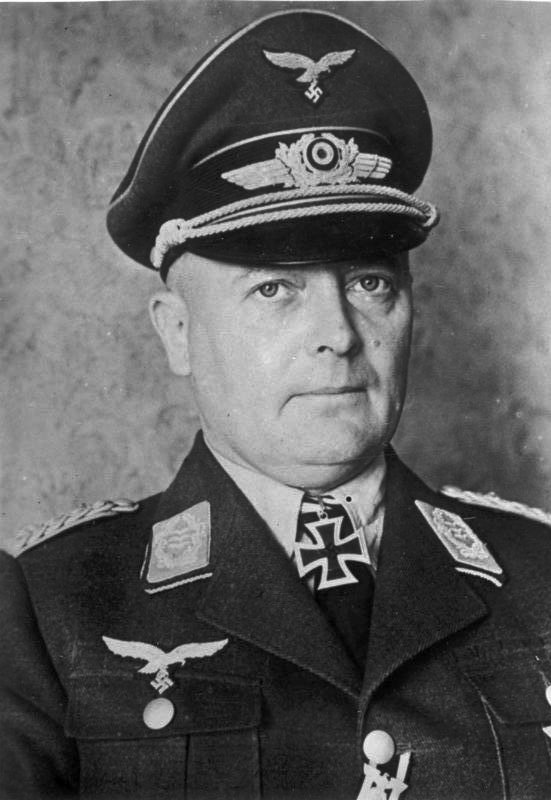
- Heidrich in 1941
- Born: Hermann Richard Heidrich; 28 July 1896; Lawalde, Kingdom of Saxony, German Empire
- Died: 22 December 1947 (aged 51); Hamburg-Bergedorf, Allied-occupied Germany
- Military career
- Allegiance: German Empire; Weimar Republic; Nazi Germany
- Branch: Imperial German Army; Freikorps; Reichswehr; Luftwaffe
- Service years: 1914–1945
- Rank: General der Fallschirmtruppe
- Commands: 7th Air Division; 1st Parachute Division; 1st Parachute Corps
- Conflicts: World War I; World War II; Occupation of Czechoslovakia; Battle of France; Battle of Crete; Eastern Front; Operation Husky; Battle of Ortona; Battle of Monte Cassino; Battle of Bologna
- Awards: Knight's Cross of the Iron Cross with Oak Leaves and Swords

Hermann Richard Heidrich (27 July 1896 – 22 December 1947) was a German paratroop general during World War II. He was a recipient of the Knight's Cross of the Iron Cross with Oak Leaves and Swords of Nazi Germany.

== Life ==
Richard Heidrich, the son of Johann Carl Heidrich and his wife Amalie, née Auguste, volunteered for military service in World War I after achieving his emergency Abitur (Notabitur). He became an officer in 1915 and won the Iron Cross 1st Class. After the war, he fought with the Freikorps in the Baltics and in 1920 was accepted by the Reichswehr, where he served in a number of posts in the infantry.

In 1938, Heidrich commanded the parachute infantry battalion (Fallschirm-Infanterie-Bataillon) of the Heer which he had formed as a Major in the infantry. Heidrich and his unit were transferred into the Luftwaffe on 1 January 1939. The Fallschirmjäger, while still in an early stage of formation, were thus augmented by a 2nd Battalion for the 1st Parachute Regiment. Heidrich was transferred to the staff of the 7th Air Division, but then left the Luftwaffe to lead the 514th Infantry Regiment in the Battle of France.

In June 1940, General Kurt Student was able to persuade Heidrich to transfer back to the Luftwaffe. He then formed the 3rd Parachute Regiment which he led with great success in the Battle of Crete.

In November 1942, Heidrich commanded the 1st Parachute Division, which was deployed on the Eastern Front. Starting 12 July 1943, the 1st Parachute Division was deployed to Sicily to counter the Allied invasion of the island. The division was directly involved in fighting around the Primosole Bridge.

The 1st Parachute Divisions toughest fighting came after the Allied landings on the Italian mainland, particularly in the three battles of Monte Cassino. Elements of the division under Heidrich's command also participated in the fighting at Anzio-Nettuno. As commanding general of the I Parachute Corps, Heidrich oversaw the corps’ withdrawal up the entire length of Italy.

On 23 January 1945, General Heidrich was seriously wounded and taken to the field hospital. He gave his last order on 1 May 1945 at the corps command post in Italy and gave up his command of the 1st Parachute Corps. He was then transferred to the hospital at home. There he was taken prisoner of war by the British on 3 May 1945.

== Death ==
When he was released from captivity in the summer of 1945, General Richard Heidrich, who had never recovered from his wounds, did not have long to live and died on 22 December 1947 at the age of just 51 in the Hamburg-Bergedorf (another source states Hamburg-Bahrenfeld) care hospital (Versorgungslazarett).

== Awards ==
- Iron Cross (1914), 2nd and 1st Class
- Saxon Albert Order, Knights Cross 2nd Class with Swords (SA3bX)
- Civil Order of Saxony, Knights Cross 2nd Class with Swords (SV3bX)
- Wound Badge (1918) in Black
- Honour Cross of the World War 1914/1918 with Swords
- Parachutist Badge of the Army
- Sudetenland Medal with the Prague Castle Bar
- Repetition Clasp 1939 to the Iron Cross 1914, 2nd and 1st Class on 25 May 1941
- Mentioned four times in the Wehrmachtbericht (9 June 1941, 24 December 1943, 25 March 1944, 29 June 1944)
- Crete Cuff Title
- Parachutist Badge of the Luftwaffe on 12 December 1943 (in exchange for the army badge)
- Wound Badge (1939) in Silver
- German Cross in Gold on 31 March 1942 as Oberst in Fallschirmjäger-Regiment 3
- Knight's Cross of the Iron Cross with Oak Leaves and Swords
  - Knight's Cross on 14 June 1941 as Oberst and commander of the Fallschirmjäger-Regiment 3
  - Oak Leaves on 5 February 1944 as Generalleutnant and commander of the 1. Fallschirmjäger-Division
  - Swords on 25 March 1944 as Generalleutnant and commander of the 1. Fallschirmjäger-Division

Military offices
Preceded by Generalleutnant Erich Petersen	Commander of 7. Flieger-Division; 1 August 1942 – 1 May 1943	Succeeded by 1st Fallschirmjäger-Division
Preceded by: 1. Flieger-Division	Commander of 1st Fallschirmjäger-Division; 1 May 1943 – 18 November 1944	Succeeded by Generalmajor Karl-Lothar Schulz
Preceded by General der Flieger Alfred Schlemm	Commander of 1st Parachute Corps; 1 November 1944 - 3 May 1945	Succeeded by None
