= 1st Parachute Division =

German WWII airborne division

1st Parachute Division 7th Air Division
- German: 1. Fallschirmjäger-Division; 7. Flieger-Division
- Unit insignia
- Active: 7th Air Div.: 1938–43; 1st Parachute Div.: 1943–45
- Country: Nazi Germany
- Branch: Luftwaffe
- Type: Fallschirmjäger
- Role: Airborne forces
- Size: Division
- Engagements: World War II

Commanders
- Notable commanders: Karl-Lothar Schulz; Kurt Student

The 1st Parachute Division (German: 1. Fallschirmjäger-Division) was an elite military parachute-landing division of the German Luftwaffe. For reasons of secrecy, it was originally raised as the 7th Air Division (German: 7. Flieger-Division), before being renamed and reorganized as the 1st Parachute Division in 1943.

== Operational history ==
The division was formed in October 1938 under the command of Major-General Kurt Student. At the start of World War II, the division contained two parachute regiments; it was brought up to full strength in 1941. In April 1940, the division took part in the invasion of Denmark and Norway during Operation Weserübung, successfully seizing several airfields.

The German plan for the invasion of Belgium and the Netherlands in May 1940 called for the use of the 7th Fliegerdivision to aid in the advance through the capture of key bridges and the fortress of Eben Emael. The invasion of the Netherlands included the majority of the 7th Fliegerdivision in cooperation with the 22nd Air Landing Division. This force was grouped as the 11th Fliegerkorps, and commanded by Kurt Student. The attack on The Hague was a failure: the high loss of transport planes grew to quite dramatic proportions. Many paratroopers and air landing troops were captured, hundreds were killed or wounded and 1,536 prisoners of both divisions were transported to England. (The Rotterdam Blitz on 14 May 1940 led to Rotterdam's surrender.) The Eben Emael assault was a complete success with both the fort itself and 1,000+ enemy captured.

The division took part in the Battle of Crete. The Allied forces on the island put up a stubborn defense and the troops of the 7th Fliegerdivision took heavy losses. With the aid of the follow-on reinforcements, and the capture of the Maleme airfield allowing resupply however, the Allies were forced to evacuate the island by 29 May.

In September 1941, the division was transferred to the Eastern Front, fighting in the vicinity of Leningrad, Stalino and later taking part in anti-partisan warfare near Smolensk. In the summer of 1942, the division was transferred to France where it trained for the planned capture of Malta. After this operation was cancelled, elements of the division saw combat in North Africa.

The division took part in the July 1943 fight against the Allied invasion of Sicily. For the remainder of the war, the division fought in the Italian Campaign. From 14–27 December 1943, the division, under General-Lieutenant Richard Heidrich, saw action against the 1st Canadian Division in the Battle of Ortona. Later the division was concentrated in the defense of the Winter Line south of Rome, defending against the advance of the British Eighth Army, commanded by Lieutenant-General Oliver Leese. In February to May 1944, the 1st Parachute Division took part in the Battle of Monte Cassino, and in late May and June it fought against the Allied Operation Diadem later retreating to the north of Rome. They formed part of the German I Parachute Corps, along with the German 4th Parachute Division.

By January 1945, the German I Parachute Corps was deployed to the Adriatic coast behind the Senio Rivier. The Allied advance resumed on 8 April, and the 1st Parachute Division was forced into a steady withdrawal toward the Po River by the British Eighth Army. Elements of the Polish II Corps captured the 1st Parachute Division’s battle flag, and on the morning of April 21, the 3rd Carpathian Rifle Division entered Bologna ahead of the American 34th Division. By 25 April, the division had completed the river crossing. They immediately set off on a final march toward the Alpine Mountains. Finally, the German surrender in Italy came on 2 May 1945, and included the men of the 1st Parachute Division. The unconditional surrender of Germany followed a week later.

== Order of battle ==
- HQ Staff
  - 1. Panzerjäger Battalion
  - 1. Pioneer Battalion
  - 1. Flak Battalion
  - 1. Medical Battalion
  - 13. Nebelwerfer Company
  - 14. Panzerjäger Company
- 1. Fallschirmjäger Regiment
- 3. Fallschirmjäger Regiment
- 4. Fallschirmjäger Regiment
- 1. Artillery Regiment
- Supply Troops

== War crimes ==
Members of various units of the division committed war crimes in Italy between 1943 and 1945. A massacre by members of the 1. Fallschirmjäger Regiment occurred on November 21, 1943, in Pietransieri, a frazione of Roccaraso in Abruzzo. A total of 128 unarmed civilians, mostly women and children, were slaughtered in the Massacre of Pietransieri. After they refused to leave the village, civilians were rounded up and executed by gunfire and explosives and their farms were set on fire and demolished. According to a project funded by the German federal government and led by a commission of historians Atlante delle Stragi Naziste e Fasciste in Italia (Atlas of the Nazi and Fascist Massacres in Italy), nearly 400 Italian civilians were murdered by members of the 1st Parachute Division by the end of the war.

== Commanders ==
Date	Commander
September 9, 1938	Generalleutnant Kurt Student
May 16, 1940	Generalleutnant Richard Putzier
October 1, 1940	Generalleutnant Wilhelm Süssmann
May 20, 1941	Generalmajor Alfred Sturm
October 1, 1941	Generalleutnant Erich Petersen
August 1, 1942	General der Fallschirmtruppe Richard Heidrich
January 4, 1944	Generalmajor Hans Korte
February 21, 1944	General der Fallschirmtruppe Richard Heidrich
November 18, 1944	Generalmajor Karl-Lothar Schulz
