= Johannes-Matthias Hönscheid =

German paratrooper and Knight's Cross recipient

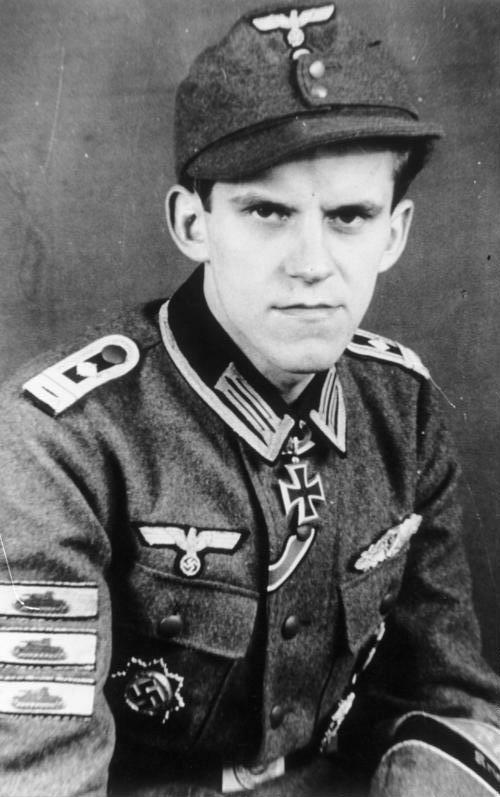
- Born: 14 July 1922; Eitorf, Rhine Province, Germany
- Died: 2 March 2001 (aged 78)
- Military career
- Allegiance: Nazi Germany
- Branch: Luftwaffe; Heer
- Rank: Leutnant
- Units: Lehrgeschwader 1 Kampfgeschwader 54; 1st Parachute Division
- Conflicts: World War II
- Awards: Knight's Cross of the Iron Cross

Johannes-Matthias Hönscheid (14 July 1922 – 2 March 2001) was a member of a propaganda company (Propagandakompanie) and officer in the Fallschirmjäger forces of Nazi Germany during World War II. He was a recipient of the Knight's Cross of the Iron Cross.

He was nominated and awarded the Knight's Cross of the Iron Cross for his actions in Italy in the final days of the war. His last assignment at the end of the war was with the Flensburg Government (Dönitz Government) as a correspondent and spokesman in Plön and Flensburg. After the war, Hönscheid worked in publishing.

== Awards and decorations ==
- German Cross in Gold (16 March 1945)
- Knight's Cross of the Iron Cross on 16 March 1945 as Oberfeldwebel and as Kriegsberichter der Fallschirmtruppe.
