= Battle of Ortona =

1943 World War II battle in Italy

- Part of the Moro River Campaign in the Italian campaign during World War II
- Canadian Armour Passing Through Ortona, by Charles Comfort. Canadian War Museum (CN 12245).
| Date | 20–28 December 1943 |
| Location | Ortona, Italy 42°21′11″N 14°24′13″E |
| Result | Canadian victory |

Belligerents
| Canada | Germany |

Commanders and leaders
| (Canada) Christopher Vokes | (Nazi Germany) Richard Heidrich |

Strength
| 1st Infantry Division | 1st Parachute Division |

Casualties and losses
| 1,375 killed (including Moro River battles); 964 wounded (Note: Mainly Canadian. Includes losses to the Loyal Edmonton Regiment of 172 casualties, of which 63 killed; the Seaforth Highlanders 103, of which 41 killed. Sources are often confused between figures for the eight days of fighting at Ortona and those for the whole of the December campaign. Zuehlke gives Canadian losses for this period of 1375 dead and 964 wounded while the Canadiansoldiers.com website says casualties for Canadian 1st Infantry Division in December (including 1st Brigade's crossing of the Moro, 2nd Brigade's fighting in the town and 3rd Brigade's attempted outflanking attack) totaled 4,206 including 695 killed.) | 867 killed, wounded or captured. |
- 1,314 civilians dead

The Battle of Ortona (20–28 December 1943) was fought between two battalions of elite German Fallschirmjäger (paratroops) from the German 1st Parachute Division under Generalleutnant Richard Heidrich, and assaulting Canadian troops from the 1st Canadian Infantry Division under Major General Christopher Vokes. It was the culmination of the fighting on the Adriatic front in Italy during "Bloody December". The battle was known to those who fought it as the "Italian Stalingrad," and as "Little Stalingrad", for the brutality of its close-quarters combat, which was only worsened by the chaotic rubble of the town and the many booby traps used by both sides. The battle took place in the small Adriatic Sea town of Ortona (Abruzzo), with a peacetime population of 10,000.

== Background ==
Communities around the Moro River. Ortona was a city of strategic importance, as one of Italy's few deep water ports on the east coast.

By late 1943, the Allies did not intend the entire Italian campaign to win the war but only to remove Italian troops from other areas of Europe, divert German forces from France and reduce the strength of the German army; the D-Day invasion was already in the planning stages for the following spring or summer. As one source indicates, "By dividing Nazi forces between several separate fronts, the Allies would prevent Hitler from striking a deadly blow at the USSR or from concentrating an invincible army along the coast of Normandy".

The British Eighth Army's offensive on the Winter Line defences east of the Apennine mountains had commenced on 23 November with the crossing of the river Sangro. By the end of the month, the main Gustav Line defences (the major part of the Winter Line) had been penetrated and the Allied troops were fighting their way forward to the next river, the Moro, 6 kilometres (4 mi) north of the mouth of which lay Ortona. For the Moro crossing in early December the exhausted British 78th Infantry Division on the Allied right flank on the Adriatic coast had been relieved by the 1st Canadian Infantry Division, under the command of Major-General Christopher Vokes. By mid-December, after fierce fighting in the cold and mud, the 1st Canadian Division's 1st Infantry Brigade, under Brigadier Howard Graham, had fought its way to within 3 km (2 mi) of Ortona and was relieved by Brigadier Bert Hoffmeister's 2nd Infantry Brigade for the advance on the town.

Some historians indicate that Ortona was of high strategic importance, as it was one of Italy's few usable deep water ports on the east coast, and was needed for docking Allied ships and to shorten Eighth Army's lines of supply which at the time stretched back to Bari and Taranto. Allied forces were ordered to maintain the offensive, and going through the built-up areas in and around Ortona was the only feasible option. Ortona was part of the Winter Line defence system and the Germans had constructed a series of interlocking defensive positions in the town. This—together with the fact that the Germans had been ordered to "fight for every last house and tree"—made the town a formidable obstacle to any attacking force.

Other historians, including Rick Atkinson, assign lesser importance for Ortona. He quotes Field Marshal Albert Kesselring who said, "We do not want to defend Ortona decisively .. but the English have made it appear as important as Rome"; General Joachim Lemelsen, the temporary commander, replied, "It costs so much in blood, it cannot be justified". Nonetheless, the Allies believed it would be merely a minor battle and proceeded with the plan; the Germans held the town with determination.

== Battle ==
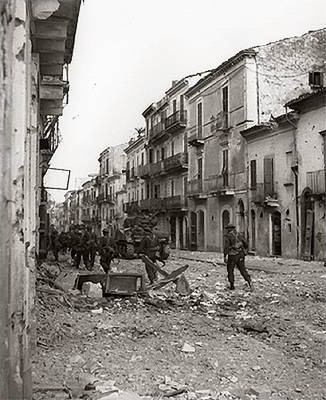
The battle saw house-to-house combat between the German 1st Parachute Division and the Canadian First Infantry Division.

The Canadians faced elements of the German 1st Parachute Division. (Note: "the best German troops in Italy" in [General] Alexander's estimation.) These soldiers were battle-hardened after many years of war, and defended doggedly.

The initial Canadian attack on the town was made on 20 December by Canadian 2nd Brigade's Loyal Edmonton Regiment with elements of The Seaforth Highlanders of Canada under command. Meanwhile, elements of the division's 3rd Infantry Brigade launched a northerly attack to the west of the town in attempt to outflank and cut off the town's rear communications but made slow progress because of the difficult terrain and the skillful and determined German defence. On 21 December 1943, the Loyal Edmonton Regiment and the Seaforth Highlanders entered Ortona, assisted by the tanks of the Three Rivers Regiment, part of the 1st Canadian Armoured Brigade, under Brigadier Robert Andrew Wyman.

=== Mouse-holing ===
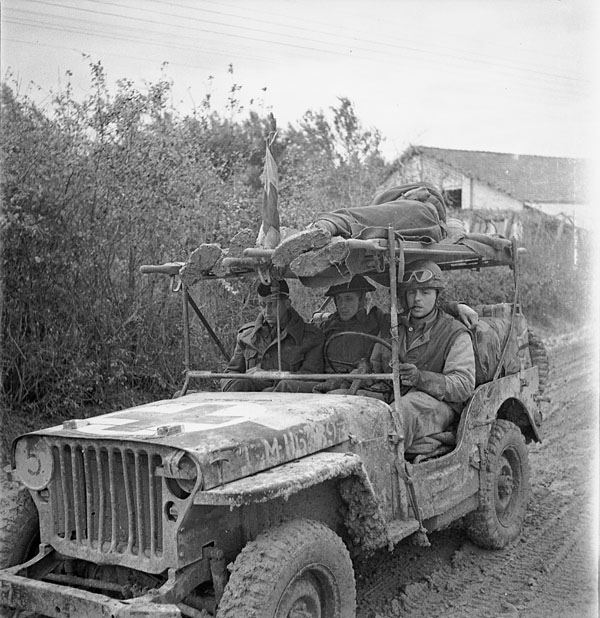
A jeep ambulance of the Royal Canadian Army Medical Corps (RCAMC) bringing in two wounded Canadian soldiers on the Moro River front, south of San Leonardo di Ortona, Italy, December 10, 1943.

The Germans had concealed various machine guns and anti-tank emplacements throughout the town, making movement by armour and infantry increasingly difficult. The house-to-house fighting was vicious and the Canadians made use of a tactic that had previously infrequently been used: "mouse-holing". This tactic involved using weapons such as the PIAT or cumbersome Teller anti-tank mines to create a large aperture in the wall of a building, as houses within Ortona shared adjoining walls. The soldiers would then throw in grenades and make their assault through the mouse holes, clearing the stairs to the top or bottom floor with grenades or machine guns; they would follow to reach any adversaries and struggle in repeated close-quarters combat. Mouse-holing was also used to pierce through walls into adjoining rooms, sometimes catching enemy troops by surprise. The tactic would be used repeatedly as assaulting through the streets caused heavy casualties for both Canadian and German troops.

Mouse-holing also allowed the soldiers to progress through the town, building by building, without entering the streets where they would face enemy fire. While some sources attribute the strategy to the Canadian forces, a British training film of 1941 had already illustrated the concept. The Canadians were certainly early, effective and courageous users of the technique. Throughout the battle, engineers on both sides also used the brutal but effective tactic of using demolition charges to collapse entire buildings on top of enemy troops.

On 28 December, after eight days of fighting, the depleted German troops finally withdrew from the town. The Canadians suffered 1,375 dead during the Moro River battles of which Ortona was one part. This represented almost a quarter of all Canadians killed during the entire Italian Campaign. Other sources placed Canadian casualties as high as 2,300 (including 500 dead) before the town was won for the Allies.

The battle has been examined post-war for lessons in urban fighting, drawing upon articles. A detailed online account exists.

=== Destruction ===
The Canadians destroyed the dome on the church of St Thomas in the town centre using tank fire, to prevent it being used for spotting. On Christmas Day the Allies (who had by then occupied a smaller church), were ordered to destroy both the cathedral and the civilian hospital, but this was largely avoided.

== Legacy ==
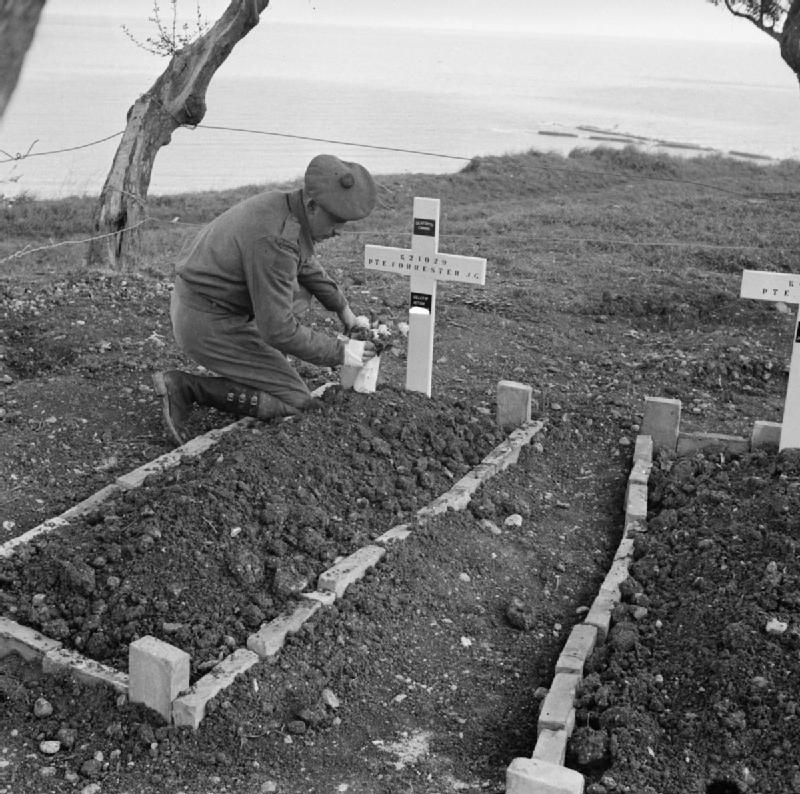
Private Ralph Forrester of the Seaforth Highlanders of Canada, 1st Canadian Division, places flowers on the grave of his brother, who was killed in action at Ortona, 16 January 1944.

Ortona was successfully liberated but the month would be considered as "Bloody December" by Canadian forces because of the numerous casualties in and around the town. As well, over 5,000 Canadians were evacuated due to battle exhaustion and illness. In addition to the Canadian losses, the German 1st Parachute Division and the 90th Light Infantry Division (Wehrmacht) also suffered numerous casualties.

The contribution made by Canadian troops was summarized as follows by Major General Christopher Vokes in his report on the Ortona offensive: "We smashed the 90th Panzer Grenadier Division and we gave the 1st German Parachute Division a mauling which it will long remember". Nonetheless, after the war, the significance of the battle in Ortona was minimized by others such as Rick Atkinson, perhaps because it did not have a significant impact on winning the war.

In November 2000, the Government of Canada erected a plaque at the Piazza Plebiscito in Ortona, in recognition of the battle as a National Historic Event of Canada that "symbolized the efforts of the Canadian Army in the Italian Campaign during World War II". The plaque reads as follows: "In early December 1943 the 1st Canadian Infantry Division and 1st Canadian Armoured Brigade began their most savage battle of the Italian Campaign. In the mud and rain troops attacked from the Moro River to Ortona. Then, from house to house and room to room there raged a ferocious battle against resolute German defenders. With extraordinary courage the Canadians prevailed, and just after Christmas finally secured the town".

== Military cemetery ==
1375 Canadian soldiers are buried at the Ortona Canadian Military Cemetery south of Ortona.

== Sources ==
- Atkinson, Rick (2013) [2007]. The Day of Battle. Abacus. ISBN 978-0-349-11635-8.
- Bercuson, David (2001) [1996]. Maple Leaf Against the Axis. Red Deer Press. ISBN 0-88995-305-8. OCLC 55973783.
- Mowat, Farley (1979). And No Birds Sang. McClelland & Stewart. p. 219 pages. ISBN 978-0-7710-6618-4.
- Zuehlke, Mark (1999). Ortona: Canada's epic World War II battle. Vancouver: Douglas & McIntyre. ISBN 1-55054-557-4.
