= Roccaraso =

- Comune
- Comune di Roccaraso
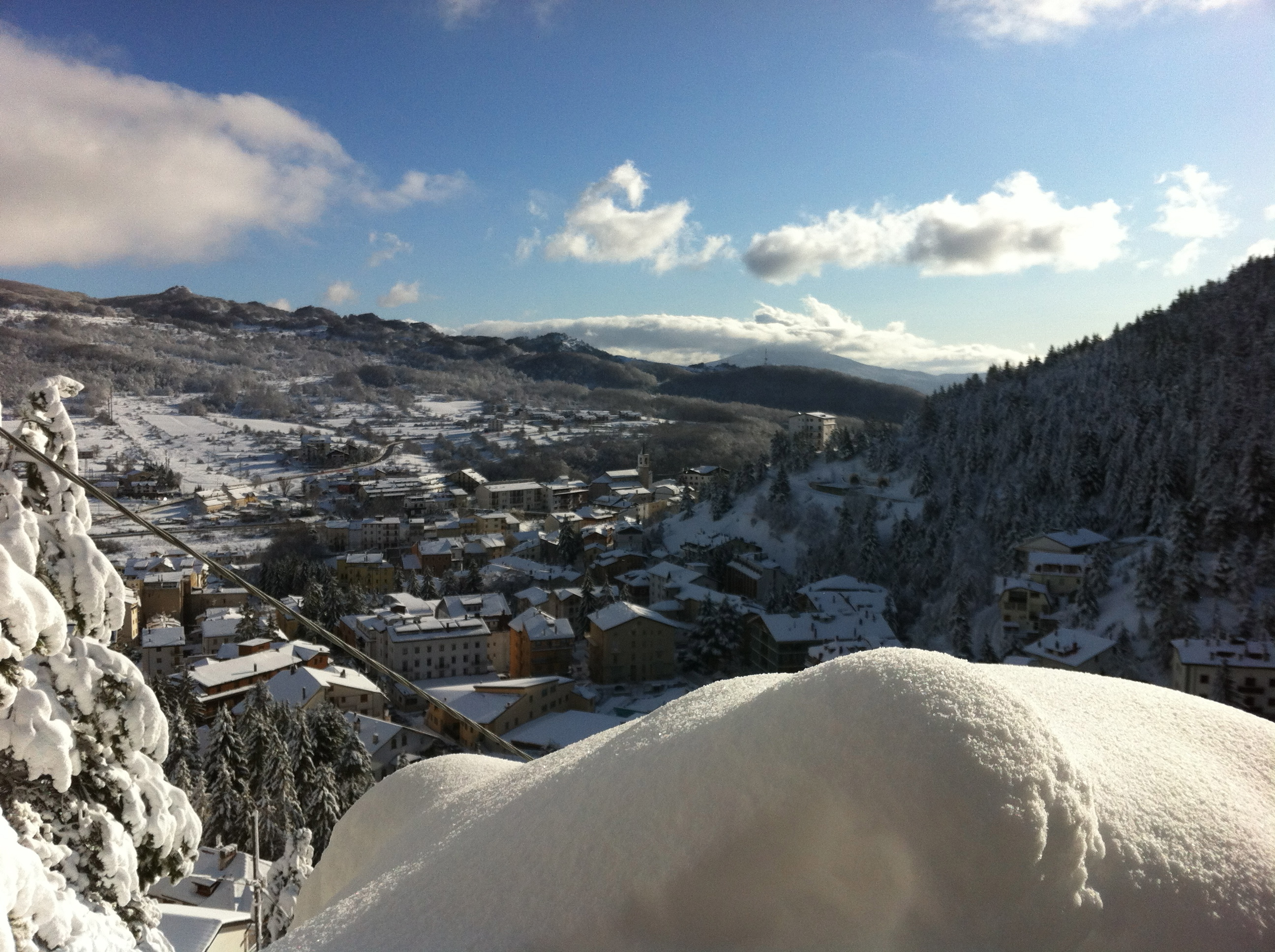

- Location within Italy Location within Abruzzo
- Coordinates: 41°51′4″N 14°4′45″E
- Country: Italy
- Region: Abruzzo
- Province: L'Aquila (AQ)
- Frazioni: Aremogna, Pietransieri, Soggiorno Montano Enel

Government
  - Mayor: Francesco Di Donato

Area
  - Total: 19.91 km^{2} (7.69 sq mi)
- Elevation: 1,236 m (4,055 ft)

Population (31 December 2021)
  - Total: 1,524
  - Density: 76.54/km^{2} (198.2/sq mi)
- Demonym: Roccolani
- Time zone: UTC+1 (CET)
  - Summer (DST): UTC+2 (CEST)
- Postal code: 67037
- Dialing code: 0864
- Patron saint: Sant'Ippolito (Hippolytus of Rome)
- Saint day: 13 August
- Website: Official website

Roccaraso is a town and comune in southern Italy, in the province of L'Aquila in the Abruzzo region.

== History ==
=== Founding ===
The town of Roccaraso dates back to around 975 AD, and is located near the Rasinus stream, from which some believe it took its original name, Rocca Rasini. It developed as a farming village, inhabited by herdsmen and craftsmen, which guaranteed its people a peaceful and prosperous life. During the late 19th century, the opening of the rail link with Naples begins to bring the first tourists, attracted by the beauty of the natural environment, who were soon welcomed by various hotels that at that time were beginning to rise.

=== World War II ===
A sharp setback came with the Second World War. Roccaraso was located right on the head of the Gustav line, the system of fortifications with which the Germans tried to stop the advance of the Allies after the landing at Salerno in September 1943. The town was completely destroyed by a bombing, which caused the loss of 'Interalia', a theater built in 1698, one of the oldest in Italy. The roccolani did not lose heart; after the end of the war the town returned to everyday life and soon became one of the most popular tourist destinations in Italy.

Roccaraso's frazione of Pietransieri is among the villages decorated for Valor for the War of Liberation that has been awarded the Gold Medal of Military Valour for the sacrifices of its people (which culminated in the Limmari Massacre) and its activities in the partisan struggle during the Second World War.

=== 2025 Neapolitan Invasion ===
Between January 25 and 26, 2025, the town was at the center of the controversy regarding overtourism, mainly caused by Neapolitans. The wave of tourists was partly driven by videos from Neapolitan influencer Rita De Crescenzo, in which she talked about the location. The large number of Neapolitan tourists and their uncivil behavior damaged the area so much that the media reported the news as the "Neapolitan invasion," and the mayor of Roccaraso described the events as "a real assault".

== Main sights ==
- Church of Santa Maria Assunta
- Medieval town of Pietransieri
- Church of San Rocco

== Ski resort Roccaraso ==
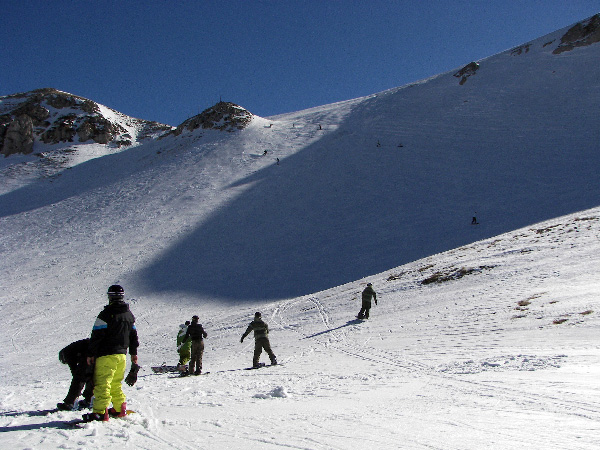
Black Track in Roccaraso (M. Aremogna)

The ski resort of Roccaraso is structured around the Mountains of Roccaraso, subgroup of Mont Greek (2,283 m (7,490 ft)), the Piano Aremogna and Pizzalto, connected directly to the plants of Rivisondoli-Monte Pratello (2,012 m (6,600 ft)), the heart of the largest ski area in central and southern Italy, the area of Alto Sangro, including around 160 km (100 mi) of downhill slopes and 36 lifts.

The first ski race was held in 1910 and the first ski lift was the 'Slittovia' in Monte Zurrone, built in 1936. Numerous competitions, both national and international, are held every year. In March 2005, Roccaraso hosted the men's and women's finals of the European Cup, and the World Junior Championships in 2012. The participants, representing dozens of countries from all five continents, contended areas laurels of victory. But only eleven teams were able to savour the joy of the podium. In particular, Norway has dominated the race winning 4 gold, 3 silver, and 1 bronze.

Because of global warming the amount of falling snow diminishes year by year. Artificial snow is a costly and environmental unfriendly solution. During January 2024 only some 20% of the pistes were open to public, which had a huge impact on the local economy.

== Notable people ==
- Domenico Angeloni (1732–1817) Italian priest, theologist, and mathematician

== Climate ==
Climate data for Roccaraso, elevation 1,245 m (4,085 ft), (1951–2000)
Month	Jan	Feb	Mar	Apr	May	Jun	Jul	Aug	Sep	Oct	Nov	Dec	Year
Record high °C (°F)	15.4 (59.7)	18.3 (64.9)	19.8 (67.6)	22.0 (71.6)	27.5 (81.5)	31.2 (88.2)	34.0 (93.2)	34.3 (93.7)	30.2 (86.4)	27.0 (80.6)	19.9 (67.8)	20.0 (68.0)	34.3 (93.7)
Mean daily maximum °C (°F)	3.7 (38.7)	4.9 (40.8)	7.7 (45.9)	10.7 (51.3)	15.6 (60.1)	19.6 (67.3)	22.9 (73.2)	23.2 (73.8)	18.8 (65.8)	14.1 (57.4)	9.0 (48.2)	4.4 (39.9)	12.9 (55.2)
Daily mean °C (°F)	−0.3 (31.5)	0.5 (32.9)	3.1 (37.6)	5.9 (42.6)	10.2 (50.4)	13.7 (56.7)	16.3 (61.3)	16.5 (61.7)	13.0 (55.4)	8.9 (48.0)	4.7 (40.5)	0.7 (33.3)	7.8 (46.0)
Mean daily minimum °C (°F)	−4.3 (24.3)	−3.9 (25.0)	−1.5 (29.3)	1.2 (34.2)	4.8 (40.6)	7.7 (45.9)	9.8 (49.6)	9.7 (49.5)	7.3 (45.1)	3.7 (38.7)	0.3 (32.5)	−3.1 (26.4)	2.6 (36.8)
Record low °C (°F)	−22.2 (−8.0)	−21.5 (−6.7)	−22.3 (−8.1)	−12.0 (10.4)	−5.9 (21.4)	−2.6 (27.3)	−2.2 (28.0)	−0.6 (30.9)	−3.0 (26.6)	−8.9 (16.0)	−16.6 (2.1)	−19.4 (−2.9)	−22.3 (−8.1)
Average precipitation mm (inches)	106.1 (4.18)	91.0 (3.58)	81.1 (3.19)	84.0 (3.31)	68.7 (2.70)	51.0 (2.01)	46.4 (1.83)	42.8 (1.69)	71.3 (2.81)	95.0 (3.74)	139.4 (5.49)	133.4 (5.25)	1,010.2 (39.78)
Average precipitation days	9.6	9.2	10.2	10.3	9.5	7.4	6.2	5.5	7.0	8.5	10.8	11.0	105.2
Source: Regione Abruzzo
