= Rudolf Witzig =

German Fallschirmjäger

- Born: 14 August 1916; Röhlinghausen in Wanne-Eickel
- Died: 3 October 2001 (aged 85); Oberschleißheim
- Military career
- Allegiance: Nazi Germany (to 1945); West Germany
- Branch: Luftwaffe
- Service years: 1935–45, 1956–74
- Rank: Major (Wehrmacht); Oberst (Bundeswehr)
- Commands: I./Fallschirm-Pionier-Regiment 21; Fallschirmjäger-Regiment 18
- Conflicts: World War II: Invasion of Poland; Battle of Fort Eben-Emael; Invasion of Crete; Battle of Tunisia; Eastern Front
- Awards: Knight's Cross of the Iron Cross with Oak Leaves

Rudolf Witzig (14 August 1916 in Röhlinghausen, Wanne-Eickel – 3 October 2001 in Oberschleißheim) was a German Fallschirmjäger during World War II and Oberst in the Bundeswehr. He was also a recipient of the Knight's Cross of the Iron Cross with Oak Leaves. The Knight's Cross of the Iron Cross, and its variants were the highest awards in the military and paramilitary forces of Nazi Germany during World War II. Witzig fought in the German attack against the Belgian fortress Fort Eben-Emael.

== Early life and career ==
Witzig, the son of an engineer, was born on 14 August 1916 in Röhlinghausen, present-day a borough of Herne, at the time in the Province of Westphalia of the Kingdom of Prussia. In 1927, the family moved to Kiel where Witzig graduated from a Realgymnasium—a secondary school built on the mid-level Realschule to achieve the Abitur (university entry qualification).

Witzig volunteered for military service in the Wehrmacht on 1 April 1935, as a Fahnenjunker (officer candidate), joining Pionier-Bataillon 16 (16th Pioneer Battalion) at Höxter. Starting in February 1936, he attended the Kriegsschule (military school) at Dresden.

== Later life ==
Witzig re-joined the military service in the newly created Bundeswehr of the Federal Republic of Germany on 16 January 1956. He retired on 30 September 1974 holding the rank of Oberst. From 1980 to 1988, he served as president of the Bund Deutscher Fallschirmjäger (Association of German Paratroopers).

== Awards ==
- Iron Cross (1939)
  - 2nd Class (12 May 1940)
  - 1st Class (13 May 1940)
- Wound Badge (1939) in Black (18 October 1941)
- Ground Assault Badge of the Luftwaffe (1 August 1943)
- German Cross in Gold on 17 October 1943 as Major in the Korps-Fallschirm-Pionier-Bataillon/XI. Flieger-Korps
- Knight's Cross of the Iron Cross with Oak Leaves
  - Knight's Cross on 10 May 1940 as Oberleutnant and leader of the Sturmgruppe "Granit" in the Fallschirmjäger-Sturm-Abteilung "Koch"
  - 662nd Oak Leaves on 25 November 1944 as Major and commander of the I./Fallschirm-Pionier-Regiment 21
- Mentioned twice in the Wehrmachtbericht (11 May 1940, 8 August 1944)
- Mentioned on Honor Roll of the Luftwaffe on 7 May 1945

=== Promotions ===
Wehrmacht
20 April 1937:	Leutnant (second lieutenant), effective as of 1 April 1937 with rank age dated 1 April 1937
31 July 1939:	Oberleutnant (first lieutenant), effective as of 1 August 1939 with rank age dated 1 August 1939
16 May 1940:	Hauptmann (captain)
24 August 1942:	Major (major), effective as of 1 September 1942 with rank age dated 1 September 1942
Bundeswehr
16 January 1956:	Oberstleutnant (lieutenant colonel), effective as of 23 December 1955
26 June 1956:	named a professional soldier
18 October 1965:	Oberst (colonel), effective as of 1 October 1965
