= Pietransieri =

Pietransieri Italian: Pietransieri
- Frazione
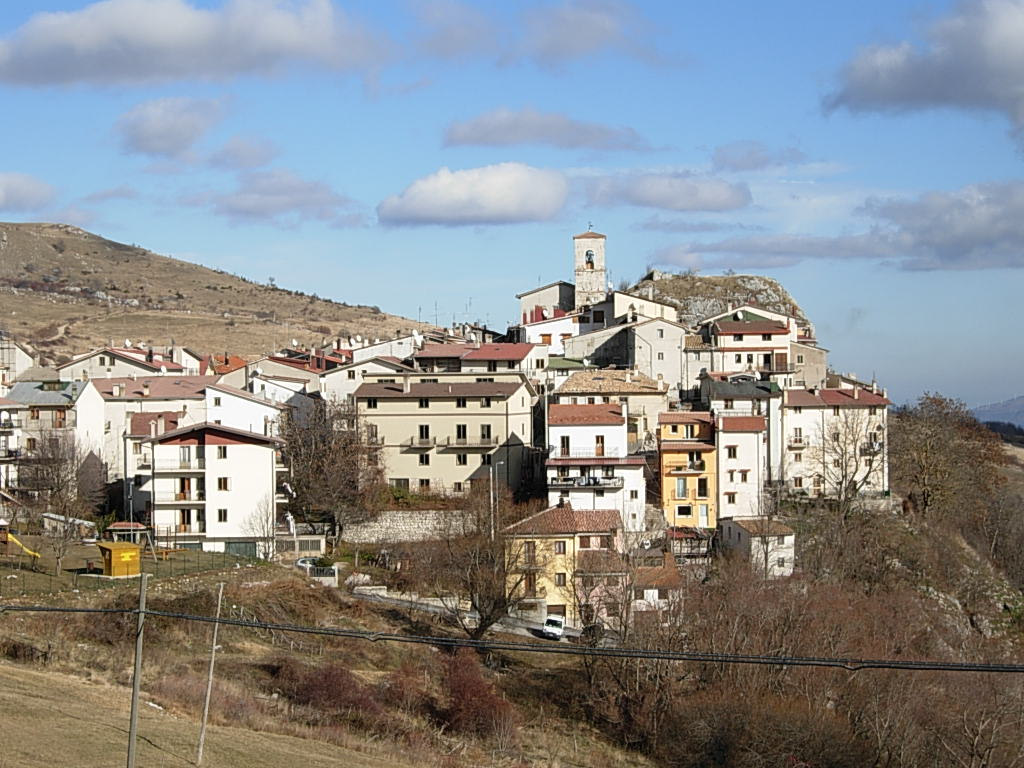

- Location within Abruzzo Location within Italy
- Coordinates: 41°50′48.05″N 14°07′08.94″E
- Country: Italy
- Region: Abruzzo
- Province: L'Aquila
- Commune: Roccaraso
- Established: 975
- Elevation: 1,359 m (4,459 ft)

Population (2004)
  - Total: 467
- Demonym: Pietransieresi
- Time zone: UTC+1 (CET)
  - Summer (DST): UTC+2 (CEST)

Pietransieri (Italian: Pietransieri) is a frazione of Roccaraso in the province of L'Aquila in the Abruzzo region of Italy. It is included in the mountain community of the Alto Sangro and the Cinque Miglia plateau.

== History ==
The village was built around 975 AD on a small rocky outcrop. The village changed its name several times (Pietra d'Anserio, Pietranziero), before the current name was adopted in the 16th century. The village was an independent municipality until 1811, when it passed to the administration of Roccaraso.

== Overview ==
Pietransieri is situated at an altitude of 1359 meters, on a side of the Tocco mountain. It leans behind a big rocky stone (in Italian la Pietra).

This village is known mostly because of the Limmari Massacre during World War II. This massacre was committed as a retaliation by Nazis on 21 November 1943 because of the suspicion that the inhabitants were helping the partisans. 128 inhabitants were killed, including 38 children, and the corpses were left in the woods.

There is an annual candlelight vigil to commemorate the victims of the massacre. In November 2018, on the 75th anniversary of the massacre, the mayor of Roccaraso, Francesco Di Donato, promoted a conference of jurists and historians about the event and also announced a project to create a Memorial Park in Pietransieri.

== Honors ==
The village of Pietransieri was among the locations awarded the Gold Medal of Military Valour for the sacrifices of its people and for its activity in the partisan struggle during the Second World War.
