= Karl-Lothar Schulz =

Nazi general (1907–1972)

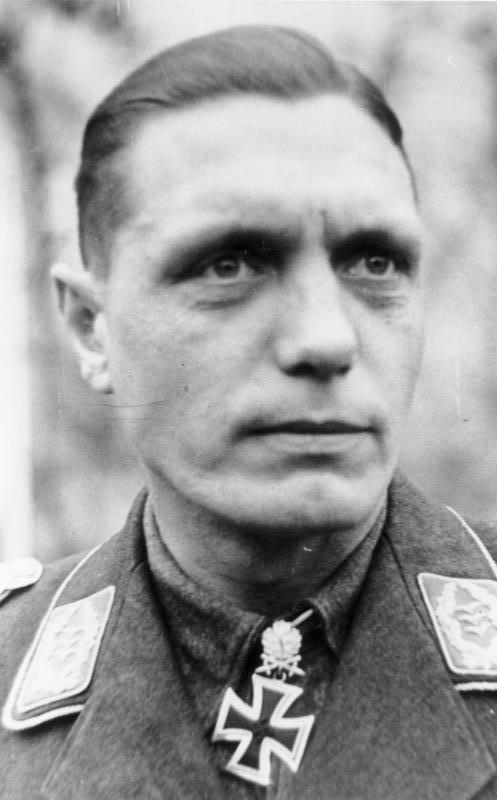
- Born: 30 April 1907; Königsburg, German Empire
- Died: 26 September 1972 (aged 65); Wiesbaden, West Germany
- Military career
- Allegiance: Nazi Germany
- Branch: Luftwaffe
- Service years: 1924–45
- Rank: Generalmajor
- Commands: Fallschirmjäger-Regiment 1
- Conflicts: World War II
- Awards: Knight's Cross of the Iron Cross with Oak Leaves and Swords

Karl-Lothar Schulz (30 April 1907 – 26 September 1972) was a German paratroop general of Nazi Germany during World War II. He was a recipient of the Knight's Cross of the Iron Cross with Oak Leaves and Swords.

== Awards ==
- Iron Cross (1939) 2nd Class (12 May 1940) & 1st Class (12 May 1940)
- German Cross in Gold on 26 February 1942 as Major in the III./Fallschirmjäger-Regiment 1
- Knight's Cross of the Iron Cross with Oak Leaves and Swords
  - Knight' Cross on 24 May 1940 as Hauptmann and commander of the III./Fallschirmjäger-Regiment 1
  - 459th Oak Leaves on 20 April 1944 as Oberst and commander of the Fallschirmjäger-Regiment 1
  - 112th Swords on 18 November 1944 as Oberst and leader of the 1. Fallschirmjäger-Division
