= German invasion of Belgium (1940) =

World War II military campaign

Battle of Belgium
- Part of the German invasion of France and the Low Countries in World War II
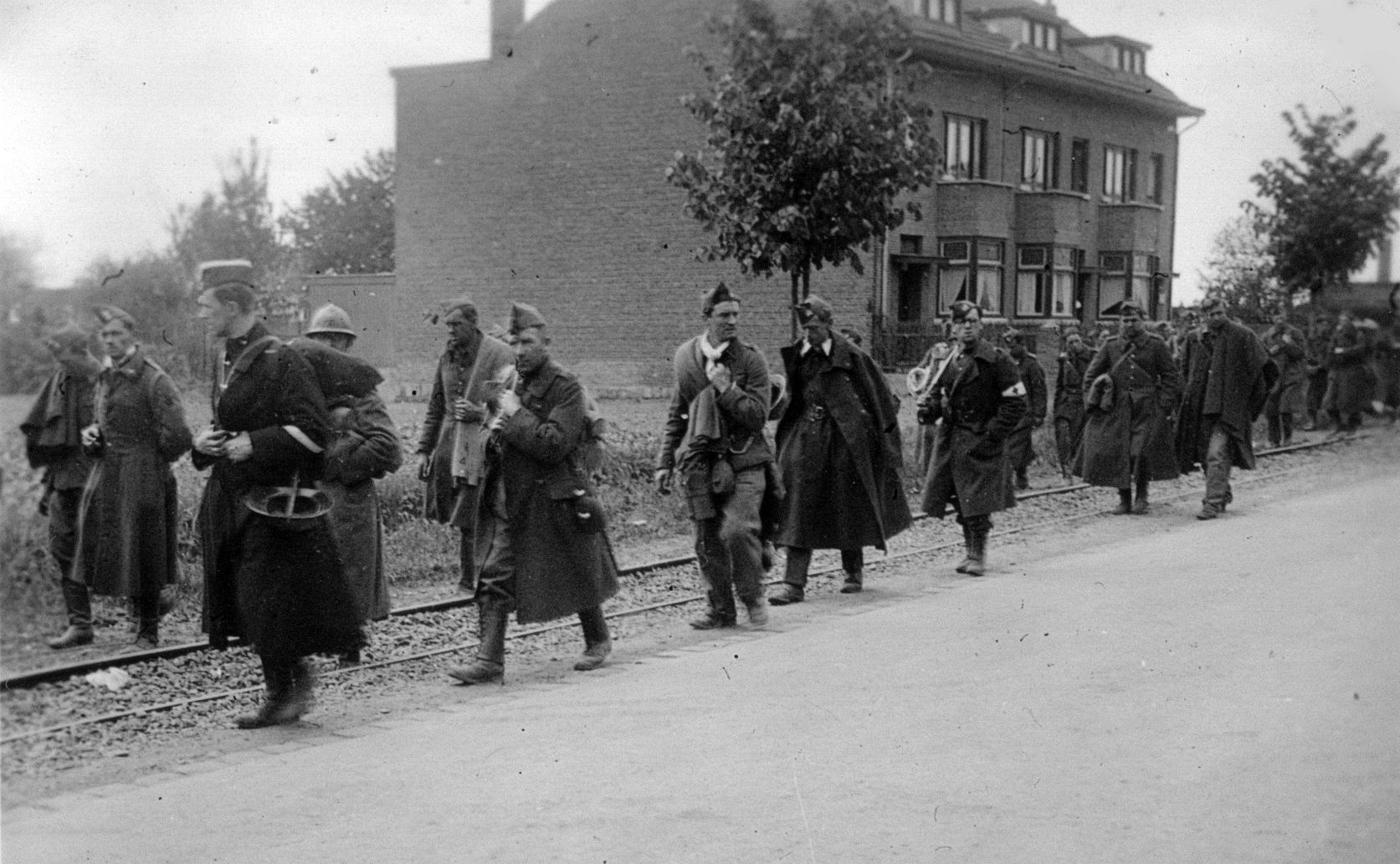
- Belgian soldiers under German guard following the fall of Fort Eben-Emael on 11 May 1940
Date	10–28 May 1940; (2 weeks and 4 days)
Location	Belgium and Luxembourg
Result	German victory
Territorial changes	Establishment of Belgian government and army in exile; German occupation of Belgium; German annexation of Eupen-Malmedy

Belligerents
Belgium; France; United Kingdom; Netherlands (Note: Contributed lightly armed infantry units retreating from Dutch territory. Also committed the Dutch Air Force on few, ineffective and costly missions. Gunsburg 1992, p. 216.); Luxembourg	Germany

Commanders and leaders
(Belgium) Leopold III (surrendered); (Belgium) Hubert Pierlot; (French Third Republic) Maurice Gamelin; (French Third Republic) Maxime Weygand; (United Kingdom) Lord Gort; (Luxembourg) Émile Speller	(Nazi Germany) Adolf Hitler; (Nazi Germany) Fedor von Bock

Strength
144 divisions (Note: The Belgian Army consisted of 22 divisions, the French provided 104, the British provided 10, and the Dutch eight divisions. Holmes 2001, p. 324.); 13,974 guns (Note: The Belgian Army had 1,338 guns, the French 10,700, the British 1,280, and the Dutch 656. Holmes 2001, p. 324.); 3,384 tanks (Note: The Belgian Army had 10 tanks, the French 3,063, the British 310 and the Dutch one tank. Holmes 2001, p. 324.); 2,249 aircraft (Note: The Belgian Air Force consisted of 250 aircraft, the French Air Force 1,368, the British Royal Air Force provided 456 aircraft and the Dutch Air Force 175. Holmes 2001, p. 324.)	141 divisions; 7,378 guns; 2,445 tanks; 5,446 aircraft (4,020 operational)

Casualties and losses
222,443+ casualties (200,000 captured) (Note: The Belgian Army sustained 6,093 men killed, 15,850 men wounded in action, more than 500 men missing and 200,000 men captured, of which 2,000 died in captivity. Keegan 2005, p. 96; Ellis 1993, p. 255. French and British losses on Belgian territory are unknown. Keegan 2005, p. 96.); ~900 aircraft (Note: The Belgian Air Force lost 83 planes on the ground on 10 May, 25 lost in aerial combat between 10 and 15 May, and four lost in the air between 16 and 28 May. Hooton 2007, pp. 49, 52, 53. French and British losses are not certain, however the French Air Force lost 264 aircraft between 12 and 25 May and 50 for 26 May to 1 June, while the British Royal Air Force lost 344 and 138 aircraft in these respective periods. Hooton 2007, p. 57.)	Uncertain (see German casualties) (Note: German air units doubled up and flew missions over the Netherlands and Belgium. Case specific loss totals for Belgium only cannot be certain. Total German losses in the air numbered 469 in 12–25 May, and 126 for 26 May – 1 June, but at least 43 paratroopers were killed and a further 100 wounded. Hooton 2007, p. 57; Dunstan 2005, p. 57.)

The invasion of Belgium or Belgian campaign (10–28 May 1940), formed part of the larger Battle of France, an offensive campaign by Germany during the Second World War. It took place over 18 days in May 1940 and ended with the German occupation of Belgium following the surrender of the Belgian Army.

On 10 May 1940, Germany invaded Luxembourg, the Netherlands, and Belgium under the operational plan Fall Gelb (Case Yellow). The Allied armies attempted to halt the German Army in Belgium, believing it to be the main German thrust. After the French had fully committed the best of the Allied armies to Belgium between 10 and 12 May, the Germans enacted the second phase of their operation, a break-through, or sickle cut, through the Ardennes, and advanced toward the English Channel. The German Army (Heer) reached the Channel after five days, encircling the Allied armies. The Germans gradually reduced the pocket of Allied forces, forcing them back to the sea. The Belgian Army surrendered on 28 May 1940, ending the battle.

The Battle of Belgium included the first tank battle of the war, the Battle of Hannut. It was the largest tank battle in history at the time but was later surpassed by the battles of the North African Campaign and the Eastern Front. The battle also included the Battle of Fort Eben-Emael, the first strategic airborne operation using paratroopers ever attempted.

The German official history stated that in the 18 days of bitter fighting, the Belgian Army were tough opponents, and spoke of the "extraordinary bravery" of its soldiers. The Belgian collapse forced the Allied withdrawal from continental Europe. The British Royal Navy subsequently evacuated Belgian ports during Operation Dynamo, allowing the British Expeditionary Force (BEF), along with many Belgian and French soldiers, to escape capture and continue military operations. France reached its own armistice with Germany in June 1940. Belgium was occupied by the Germans until the late summer and autumn of 1944, when it was liberated by the Western Allies.

== Pre-battle plans ==
=== Belgium's strained alliances ===
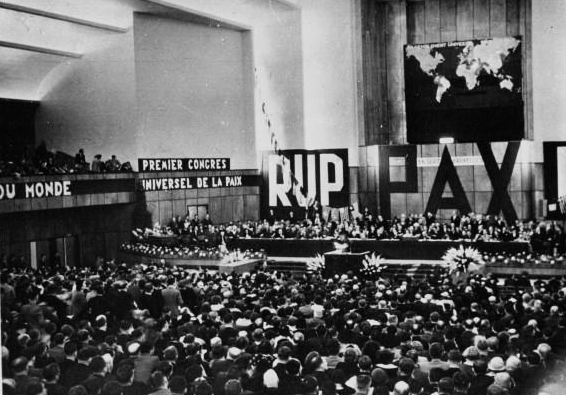
A pacifist rally in Heysel, near Brussels, in 1936

The Belgian strategy for a defence against German aggression faced political as well as military problems. In terms of military strategy, the Belgians were unwilling to stake everything on a linear defence of the Belgian–German border, in an extension of the Maginot Line. Such a move would leave the Belgians vulnerable to a German assault in their rear, through an attack on the Netherlands. Such a strategy would also rely on the French to move quickly into Belgium and support the border garrisons there.

Belgium was wary of continuing its existing treaty alliance with France, the Franco-Belgian Accord of 1920 concluded on 7 September that year. Marshal Philippe Pétain had suggested to execute in case of war a French strike at Germany's Ruhr area using Belgium as a spring-board, in October 1930 and again in January 1933. Belgium feared it would be drawn into a war regardless, and sought to avoid that eventuality. The Belgians also feared being drawn into a war as a result of the French–Soviet pact of May 1935. The Franco-Belgian agreement stipulated Belgium was to mobilise if the Germans did, but what was not clear was whether Belgium would have to mobilise in the event of a German invasion of Poland.

The Belgians much preferred an alliance with the United Kingdom. The British had entered the First World War in response to the German violation of Belgian neutrality. The Belgian southern North Sea (often imprecisely referred to as "Channel") ports had offered the German Imperial Navy valuable bases, and their possible occupation would offer the German Kriegsmarine and the Luftwaffe bases to engage in strategic offensive operations against the United Kingdom in a coming conflict. The UK would thus seem to have a vested interest in protecting the area. However, the British government paid little attention to the concerns of the Belgians. This lack of commitment ensured the Belgian withdrawal from the Western Alliance, the day before the remilitarisation of the Rhineland. The lack of opposition to the remilitarisation served to convince the Belgians that France and Britain were unwilling to fight for their own strategic interests, let alone Belgium's. The Belgian General Staff was determined to fight for its own interests, alone if necessary.

The changing Belgian attitudes were also determined by fundamental internal social developments. The Flemish Movement became ever more powerful and was by its nature averse to French influences. In 1935, the socialist Paul-Henri Spaak came to power and had to appease a strong pacifist wing in his party. At the same time, the Walloons vehemently objected to any strategy abandoning most French-speaking areas to the Germans.

=== Belgian place in Allied strategy ===
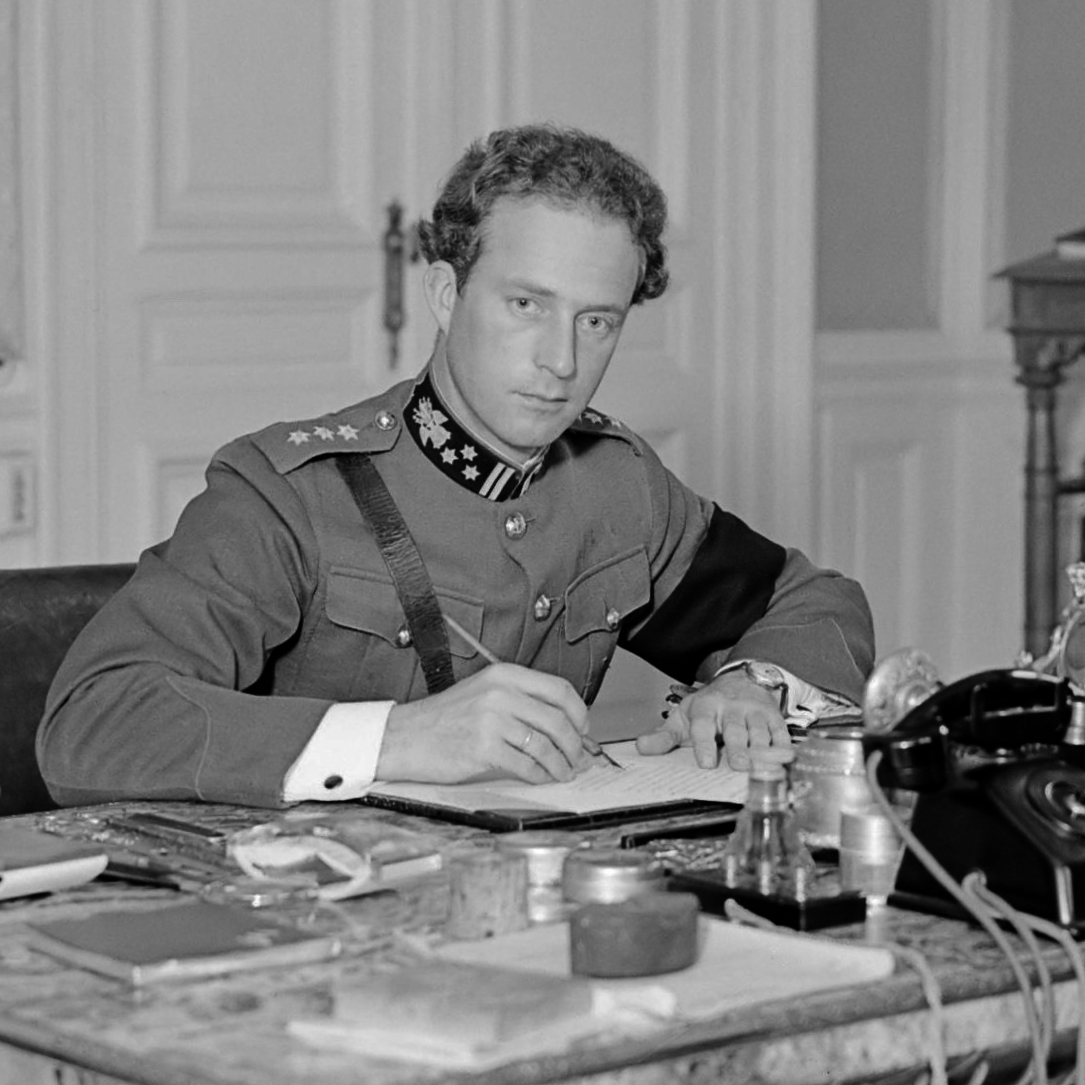
King Leopold III, Belgian head of state, an advocate of the policy of neutrality

The French government was infuriated at King Leopold III's open declaration of neutrality in October 1936. The French Army saw its strategic assumptions undermined; it could no longer expect cooperation from the Belgians in defending Belgium's eastern borders, which would allow it to stop a German attack well forward of the French border. The French were dependent on cooperation from the Belgians. Such a situation deprived the French of any prepared defences in Belgium to forestall an attack, a situation which the French had wanted to avoid as it meant engaging the German Panzer divisions in a mobile battle. The French considered invading Belgium immediately in response to a German attack on the country. The Belgians, recognising the danger posed by the Germans, secretly made their own defence policies, troop movement information, communications, fixed defence dispositions, intelligence and air reconnaissance arrangements available to the French military attaché in Brussels. Officially, the Belgian government retained a suspicious posture towards France, considering them as equal a danger to Belgian sovereignty as the Third Reich. French forces were not allowed to enter Belgium, even when the German plans to invade became imminent.

In 1940, the Allied plan to aid Belgium had become the Dyle Plan; the cream of the Allied forces, including French armoured divisions, would advance to the Dyle river in response to a German invasion. The earlier alternatives for an established Allied line had been either reinforcing the Belgians in the east of the country, at the already fortified Meuse–Albert Canal line, or holding the Scheldt river, thus linking the French border defences to the south with the Belgian forces protecting Ghent and Antwerp. However, the Albert Canal would probably take too much time to reach, while a Scheldt line would create a too long salient. Entrenching at the Dyle in central Belgium, the defences extending westwards along the wide and practically impassable Scheldt Estuary, therefore seemed to be the soundest defensive strategy.

The weakness of the Dyle plan was that it abandoned most of eastern Belgium to the Germans. This included the easily defensible Ardennes region which would have covered the northern flank of the Maginot Line, but also the modern fortifications at the Albert Canal and the Meuse. Militarily it would rotate the Allied right wing perpendicular to the French frontier defences east of Sedan, creating a vulnerable "hinge" point there. It also increased logistical problems for the British. It lengthened their supply lines with the Channel ports, while the connections with the stock piles in northern France would run parallel to their front and become easily cut by a slight German advance. Despite these risks inherent to committing forces to central Belgium and an advance to the Scheldt or Dyle lines, which would be vulnerable to an outflanking move from the south, Maurice Gamelin, the French commander, approved the plan and it basically remained the Allied strategy at the outbreak of war.

The British, with only a small army in the field and behind in rearmament, were in no position to challenge French strategy, which had become dominant in the Western Alliance. Having little ability to influence French decision-making, the British strategy for military action limited itself to planning a strategic bombing of the Ruhr industry.

=== Belgian military strategy ===
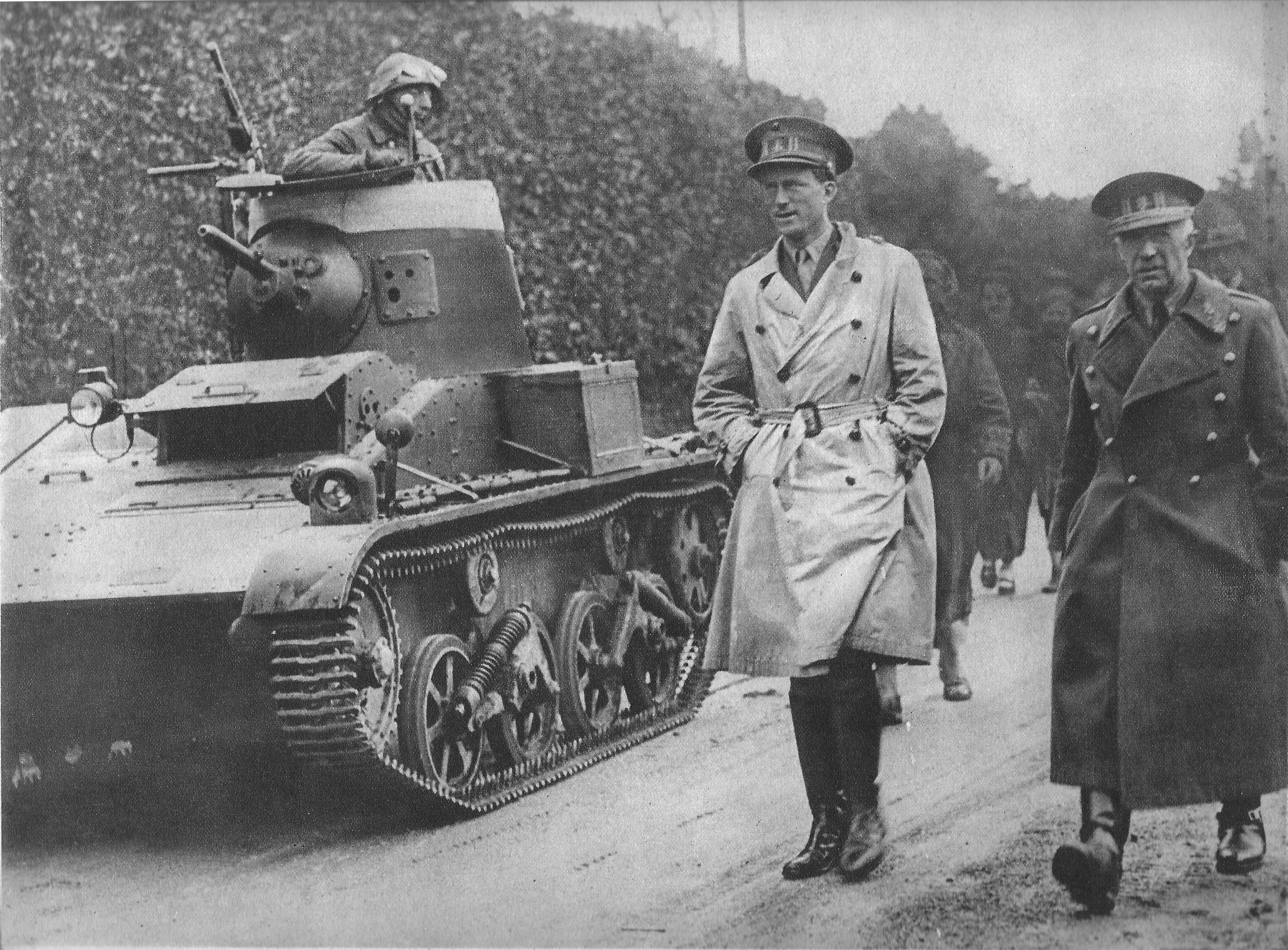
Leopold III, Belgium's monarch from 1934, reviewing Belgian troops in early 1940 and walking alongside a T-15 tank

Following the official Belgian withdrawal from the Western Alliance, the Belgians refused to engage in any official staff meetings with French or British military staff for fear of compromising their neutrality. The Belgians did not regard a German invasion as inevitable and were determined that if an invasion did take place it would be effectively resisted by new fortifications such as Eben Emael. The Belgians had taken measures to reconstruct their defences along their border with Germany upon Adolf Hitler's rise to power in January 1933. The Belgian government had watched with increasing alarm the German withdrawal from the League of Nations, its repudiation of the Treaty of Versailles and its violation of the Locarno Treaties. The government modernised fortifications at Namur and Liège, and established new lines of defence along the Zuid-Willemsvaart (the Maastricht–'s-Hertogenbosch canal), joining the Meuse, the Scheldt and the Albert Canal lines. Protection of the eastern frontier, based mainly on obstructing a number of roads by trees, landslides and destroying key bridges, was entrusted to new formations (frontier cyclist units and the newly formed Chasseurs Ardennais). By 1935, the Belgian defences were completed. Even so, it was felt that the defences were no longer adequate. A significant mobile reserve was needed to guard the rear areas, without which the protection against a surprise assault by German forces would not be sufficient. Significant manpower reserves would also be needed, but the public rejected a bill requiring longer military service and refresher training for fears that it would increase Belgium's military commitments, perhaps in conflicts far from home.

King Leopold III delivered a speech on 14 October 1936 before the Council of Ministers to persuade the people and the government that Belgium's defences needed strengthening. He stressed three main military arguments for Belgium's increased rearmament:

a) German rearmament and the complete re-militarisation of Italy and Russia had caused most other states, even pacifists like Switzerland and the Netherlands, to take exceptional precautions.
b) Vast changes in military methods, particularly in aviation and mechanization, meant that initial operations could now be of alarming force, speed and magnitude.
c) The lightning reoccupation of the Rhineland came with bases for the start of a possible German invasion moving close to the Belgian frontier.

On 24 April 1937, the French and British publicly declared that Belgium's security was paramount to the Western Allies and that they would defend their borders against aggression of any sort, whether directed solely at Belgium, or to obtain bases to wage war against "other states". The British and French released Belgium from her Locarno obligations to render mutual assistance in the event of German aggression toward Poland, while the British and French maintained their military obligations to Belgium.

Militarily, the Belgians considered the Wehrmacht stronger than the Allies, and that engaging in overtures to the Allies would make Belgium a battleground without adequate allies.

After the start of the Second World War in September 1939, the Belgians and French remained confused about what was expected of whom if or when hostilities actually commenced. The Belgians initially had been determined to hold the fortifications along the Albert Canal and the Meuse, without withdrawing, until the French Army arrived to support them. Gamelin, however, was not keen on pushing his Dyle plan that far. He was concerned that the Belgians would be driven out of their defences and would retreat to Antwerp, as in 1914. When it became clear that there was to be no French advance towards the Albert Canal, the Belgian divisions were planned to withdraw after resisting for only a short period and retreat westward to link up with the French/British forces. This information was not communicated to Gamelin, who assumed he had sufficient time to entrench at the Dyle.

As far as the Belgians were concerned, the Dyle Plan had advantages. Instead of the limited Allied advance to the Scheldt, or meeting the Germans on the Franco-Belgian border, the move to the Dyle river would reduce the Allied front in central Belgium by 70 kilometres (43 mi), freeing more forces for use as a strategic reserve. Belgium hoped to retain more Belgian territory, in particular the central industrial regions. It also had the potential to easily absorb Dutch and Belgian Army formations (including some twenty Belgian divisions). Gamelin justified the Dyle Plan after the defeat using these arguments.

On 10 January 1940, in an episode known as the Mechelen Incident, German Army major Hellmuth Reinberger crash-landed in a Messerschmitt Bf 108 near the Belgian village of Mechelen-aan-de-Maas. Reinberger was carrying initial plans for the German invasion of the Low Countries which, as Gamelin had expected, resembled the 1914 Schlieffen Plan in that they envisaged a German thrust through central Belgium (which was expanded by the Wehrmacht to include the Netherlands) and into France.

The Belgians suspected a ruse, but the (authentic) plans were nevertheless taken seriously. Belgian intelligence and the military attaché in Cologne suggested that after it had been revealed the Germans would no longer commence any invasion with this plan. They now assumed that the Germans would try a main thrust through the Belgian Ardennes and advance to Calais to encircle the Allied armies in Belgium. The Belgians correctly predicted that the Germans would attempt a Kesselschlacht (literally "cauldron battle", meaning encirclement), to destroy their enemies. Even though there was no causal connection between the Mechelen Incident and the change in German strategic thinking, the Belgians thus predicted the alternative German plan as was at the time being developed by Erich von Manstein.

The Belgian high command warned the French and British of their concerns. They feared that the Dyle plan would put not just the Belgian strategic position in danger, but also the entire left wing of the Allied front. King Leopold and General Raoul Van Overstraeten, the King's aide de camp, warned Gamelin and the French Army command of their concerns on 8 March and 14 April. They were ignored.

=== Belgian plans for defensive operations ===
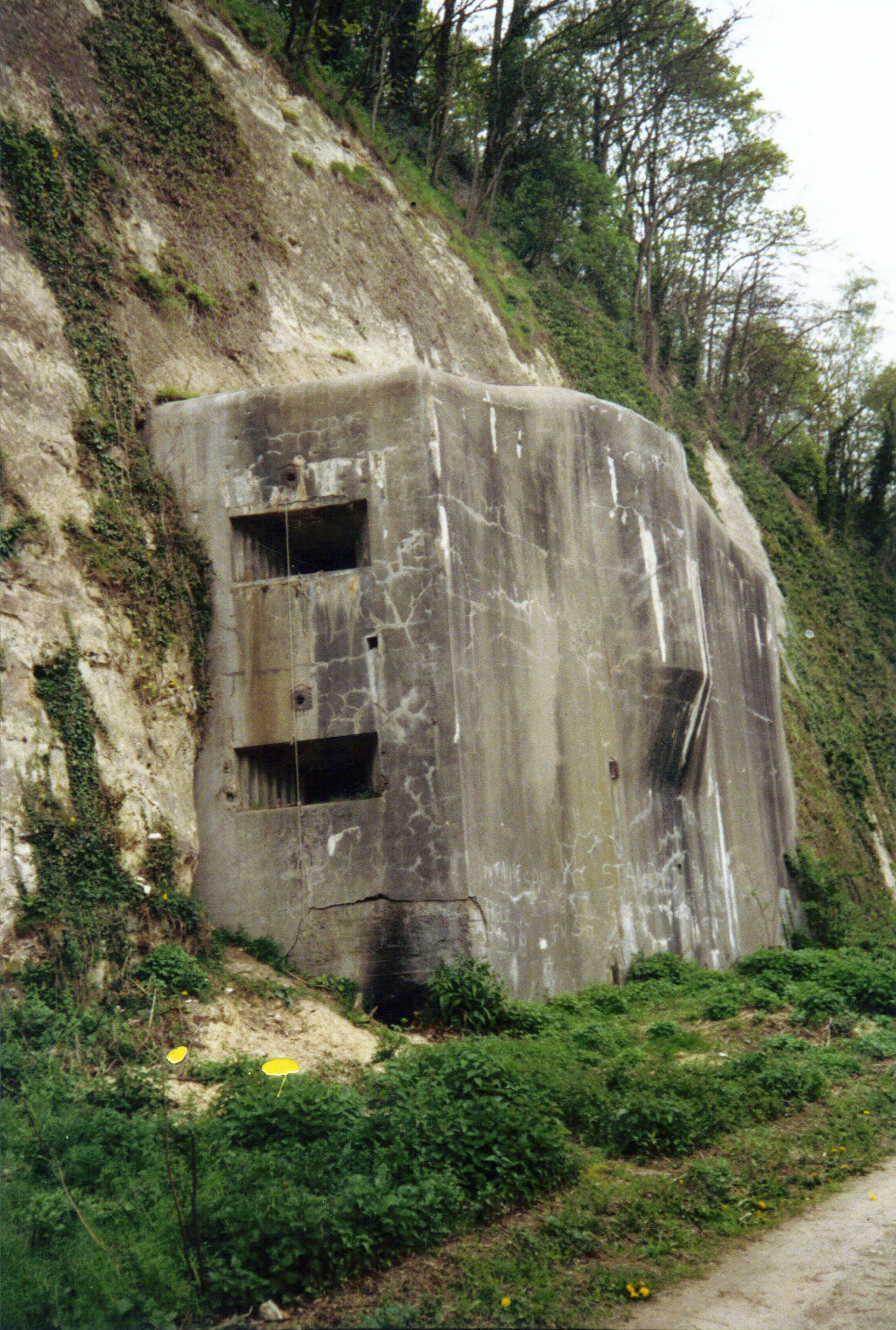
Eben-Emael: the Belgians hoped to severely delay the Germans using such fortifications

The Belgian plan, in the event of German aggression [italics in original] provided for:

(a) A delaying position along the Albert Canal from Antwerp to Liège and the Meuse from Liège to Namur, which was to be held long enough to allow French and British troops to occupy the line Antwerp–Namur–Givet. It was anticipated that the forces of the guarantor Powers would be in action on the third day of an invasion.
(b) A withdrawal to the Antwerp–Namur position.
(c) The Belgian Army was to hold the sector [north of, but] excluding Leuven, but including Antwerp, as part of the main Allied defensive position.

In an agreement with the British and French armies, the largely motorised French 7th Army under the command of Henri Giraud was to quickly advance into Belgium, past the Scheldt Estuary in Zeeland if possible, to Breda, in the Netherlands. The British Army's British Expeditionary Force or BEF, commanded by General John Vereker, Lord Gort, was to occupy the central position on the Brussels–Ghent axis supporting the Belgian Army, holding the main defensive positions, some 20 kilometres (12 mi) east of Brussels. The main defensive position ringing Antwerp would be protected by the Belgians along the old fortress belt, barely 10 kilometres (6.2 mi) from the city. The French 7th Army was to reach Zeeland and Breda, just inside the Dutch border and connect to the Dutch army. The French would then be in a position to protect the left flank of the Belgian Army forces protecting Antwerp and threaten the German northern flank.

Further east, delaying positions were constructed in the immediate tactical zones along the wide Albert Canal, which was imminently defensible, cutting deep into marl strata and joined with the defences of the Meuse west of Maastricht. The line there deviated southward, and continued to Liège. The Maastricht–Liège axis was heavily protected. Fort Eben-Emael guarded Liège's northern flank, the tank country lying in the strategic depths of the Belgian forces occupying the city and the axis of advance into the west of the country. Further lines of defence ran to the south-west, covering the Liège–Namur axis. The Belgian Army also had the added benefit of the powerful French 1st Army, advancing toward Gembloux and Hannut, on the southern flank of the BEF covering the Sambre sector. This covered the "Gembloux gap" in the Belgian defences between the main Belgian positions on the Dyle line and Namur to the south, where a German armoured breakthrough attempt was expected. Further south still, the French 9th Army advanced to the Givet–Dinant axis on the Meuse river. The French 2nd Army was responsible for the last 100 kilometres (62 mi) of front, covering Sedan, the upper Meuse, the Belgian–Luxembourg border and the northern flank of the Maginot line.

=== German operational plans ===
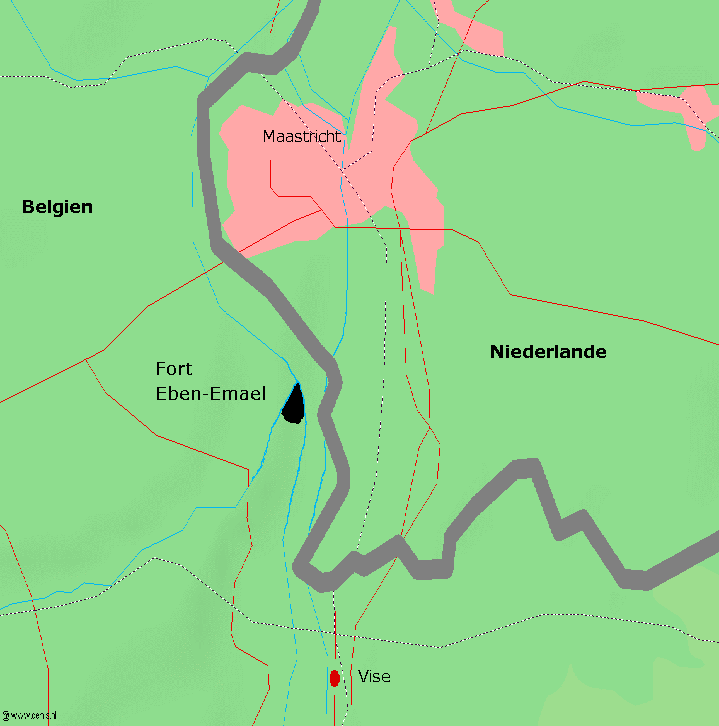
Map of the area between Belgium and the Netherlands near Fort Eben-Emael: The fort protected the vital strategic bridgeheads into Belgium

The German plan of attack required that Army Group B would advance and draw the Allied First Army Group into central Belgium, while Army Group A conducted the surprise assault through the Ardennes. Belgium was to act as a secondary front and a feint. Army Group B was given only a limited number of armoured and motorised units, while the vast majority of the army group comprised infantry divisions. After the English Channel had been reached, all Panzer division units and most motorised infantry were eventually removed from Army Group B and given to Army Group A, to strengthen the German lines of communication and to prevent an Allied breakout.

This plan would still fail if sufficient ground could not be quickly taken in Belgium to squeeze the allies between two fronts. An obstacle to the desired outcome were the defences of Fort Eben-Emael and the Albert Canal. The three bridges over the canal near Maastricht were the key to allowing Army Group B to advance at high speed. The bridges at Veldwezelt, Vroenhoven and Kanne in Belgium, and two bridges over the Meuse at Maastricht on the Dutch side of the border, were the targets. Failure to capture the canal bridges would leave Walter von Reichenau's German 6th Army, the southernmost army of Group B, trapped in the Maastricht-Albert Canal enclave and subject to the fire of Eben-Emael. The fort had to be captured or its cannon neutralised.

Adolf Hitler summoned Lieutenant-General Kurt Student of the 7. Flieger-Division (7th Air Division) to discuss the assault. It was first suggested that a conventional parachute drop be made by airborne forces to seize and destroy the forts' guns before the land units approached. Such a suggestion was rejected as the Junkers Ju 52 transports were too slow and were likely to be vulnerable to Dutch and Belgian anti-aircraft guns. Other factors for its refusal were the weather conditions, which might blow the paratroopers away from the fort and disperse them too widely. A seven-second drop from a Ju 52 at minimum operational height led to a dispersion over 300 metres alone.

Hitler had noticed one potential flaw in the defences. The top surfaces were flat and unprotected; he demanded to know if a glider, such as the DFS 230, could land on them. Student replied that it could be done, but only by 12 aircraft and in daylight; this would deliver 80–90 paratroopers onto the target. Hitler then revealed the tactical weapon that would make this strategic operation work, introducing the Hohlladungwaffe (hollow-charge) – a 50 kilograms (110 lb) explosive weapon which could penetrate the Belgian gun turrets. This glider tactical unit spearheaded the first strategic airborne operation in history, which also included simultaneous airborne attacks on The Hague, Rotterdam and Dort in Holland.

== Forces involved ==
=== Belgian forces ===
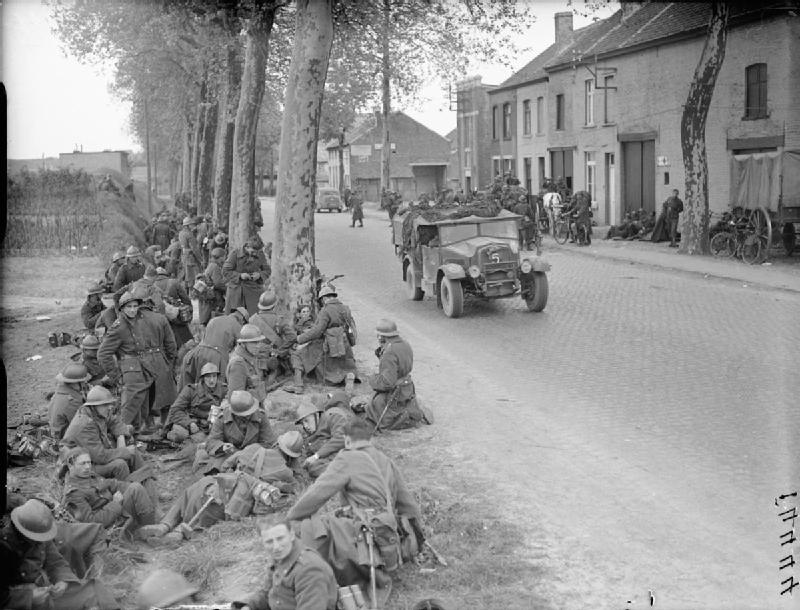
Belgian soldiers resting on the roadside

The Belgian Army could muster 22 divisions, which were equipped with 1,338 artillery pieces but just 10 AMC 35 tanks. However, the Belgian combat vehicles additionally included 200 T-13 tank destroyers. These had excellent 47 mm antitank guns and coaxial FN30 machine guns in turrets. The Belgians also possessed 42 T-15s. They were for political reasons officially described as "armoured cars" but were actually fully tracked tanks with 13.2 mm turret machine guns. The standard Belgian anti-tank gun was the 47 mm FRC, towed either by a truck or by a fully tracked armoured VCL Utility (Utilitié) Tractor B. One report states that a round from a 47 mm gun went straight through a Sd kfz 231 and penetrated the armour of the Panzerkampfwagen IV behind it. These Belgian guns were better than the 25 mm Hotchkiss anti-tank gun and 3.7 cm Pak 36 guns of, respectively, the French and the Germans.

The Belgians began mobilisation on 25 August 1939 and by May 1940 mounted a field army of 18 infantry divisions, two divisions of partly motorised Chasseurs Ardennais and two motorised cavalry divisions, a force totalling some 600,000 men. Belgian reserves might have been theoretically able to raise this to 900,000 men. Manpower was, however, demographically constrained by losses during the First World War and a low birth rate. The male population was rather aged and the total population numbered only eight million. The Army lacked sufficient armour and anti-aircraft guns.

After the completion of the Belgian Army's mobilisation, it could muster five regular corps and two reserve army corps consisting of twelve regular infantry divisions, two divisions of Chasseurs Ardennais, six reserve infantry divisions, one brigade of cyclist Frontier Guards, one cavalry corps of two divisions, and one brigade of motorised cavalry. The Army contained two anti-aircraft artillery and four artillery regiments, and a number of fortress, engineer, and signals force personnel.

After the Belgian Corps of Torpedo Boats and Marines had been disbanded on 31 March 1927, a civilian State Marine remained which patrolled Antwerp harbour and used some disarmed vessels for fishery protection. A Belgian Naval Corps (Corps de Marine/Marinekorps) was resurrected on 15 September 1939. It was part of the Army and deployed twenty-nine patrol boats, pilot vessels and (mine-sweeping) trawlers. On 17 May, the entire Belgian fishing fleet of 507 vessels was ordered to assist in evacuating troops from the Belgian coast. Most of the Belgian merchant fleet, some 100 ships with 358,000 tons, evaded capture by the Germans. Under the terms of a Belgian–Royal Navy agreement, these ships and their 3,350 crewmen were placed under British control for the duration of hostilities. They suffered heavy losses and only 28,000 tons of the original tonnage remained at the end of the war. The general headquarters of the Belgian naval component was at Ostend under the command of army Major Henry Decarpentrie. The First Naval Division was based at Ostend, while the Second and Third divisions were based at Zeebrugge and Antwerp.

The Aéronautique Militaire Belge (Belgian Air Force - AéMI) had barely begun to modernise their aircraft technology. The AéMI had ordered Brewster Buffalo, Fiat CR.42, and Hawker Hurricane fighters, Koolhoven F.K.56 trainers, Fairey Battle and Caproni Ca.312 light bombers, and Caproni Ca.335 fighter-reconnaissance aircraft, but only the Fiats, Hurricanes, and Battles had been delivered. The shortage of modern types meant single-seat versions of the Fairey Fox light bomber were being used as fighters. The AéMI possessed 250 combat aircraft. At least 90 were fighters, 12 were bombers and 12 were reconnaissance aircraft. Only 50 were of reasonably modern standard. When liaison and transport aircraft from all services are included, the total strength was 377; however only 118 of these were serviceable on 10 May 1940. Of this number around 78 were fighters and 40 were bombers.

The AéMI was commanded by Paul Hiernaux, who had received his pilot's license just before the outbreak of World War I, and had risen to the position of commander-in-chief in 1938. Hiernaux organised the service into three Régiments d'Aéronautique (air regiments): the 1er with 60 aircraft, the 2ème with 53 aircraft, and the 3ème with 79 aircraft.

=== French forces ===
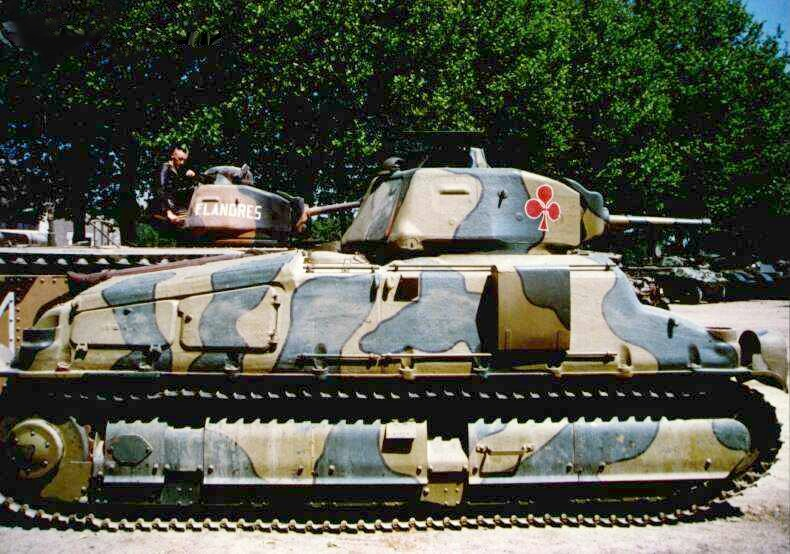
The SOMUA S35 tank was considered one of the most modern types in French service at the time.

The Belgians were afforded substantial support by the French Army. The French 1st Army included ten divisions, among which were General René Prioux's Cavalry Corps. The corps was given the 2nd Light Mechanized Division (2^{e} Division Légère Mécanique, or 2^{e} DLM) and the 3rd Light Mechanized Division (3^{e} DLM), which were allocated to defend the Gembloux gap. The armoured forces consisted of 176 of the formidable SOMUA S35s and 239 Hotchkiss H35 light tanks. Both of these types, in armour and firepower, were superior to most German types. The 3^{e} DLM contained 90 S35s and some 140 H35s alone.

The French 7th Army was assigned to protect the northernmost part of the Allied front. It contained, apart from three infantry divisions, the 1st Light Mechanized Division (1^{re} DLM) which was the best-trained French armoured division, the 25th Motorised Infantry Division (25^{e} Division d'Infanterie Motorisée, or 25^{e} DIM) and the 9th Motorised Infantry Division (9^{e} DIM). This force would advance to Breda in the Netherlands.

The third French army to see action on Belgian soil was the 9th with eight divisions. It was weaker in firepower than both the 7th and the 1st armies. The 9th Army was allocated five infantry or fortress divisions that only had a minimal number of trucks. An exception were the 5th Motorised Infantry Division (5^{e} DIM) and two partly motorised Cavalry divisions, 1st and 4th DLC. Its mission was to protect the long southern flank of the Allied armies along the Meuse, south of Namur and the Sambre river and just north of Sedan. Further south, in France, was the French 2nd Army with nine divisions, protecting the Franco-Belgian border between Sedan and Montmédy. The two weakest French armies were thus protecting the area of the main German thrust.

=== British forces ===
The British contributed the numerically weakest force to Belgium. The BEF, under the command of Gort, initially consisted of just 152,000 men in two corps of two divisions each. The British planned to field two armies of two corps each by the summer of 1940, but this had not yet materialised in May 1940. The I Corps was commanded by Lt-Gen. John Dill, later Lt-Gen. Michael Barker, who was in turn replaced by Major-General Harold Alexander. Lt-Gen. Alan Brooke commanded II Corps. Both corps were subsequently reinforced by a third division. Later the III Corps under Lt-Gen. Ronald Adam was added to the British order of battle. A further 9,392 Royal Air Force (RAF) personnel of the RAF Advanced Air Striking Force under the command of Air Vice-Marshal Patrick Playfair was to support operations in Belgium. By May 1940, the BEF had grown to 394,165 men. Although it was more fully motorised than any other army, allied or German, that would participate in the coming battle, providing it a superior tactical mobility, this also implied that more than 150,000 men were part of the logistical rear area organisations and had little military training. This was partly offset by a large proportion of professionals in the combat troops, which were well-equipped with Ordnance QF 2-pounder anti-tank guns and two-inch mortars. On 10 May 1940, the BEF sent to Belgium comprised just 10 divisions (not all at full strength), 1,280 artillery pieces and 310 tanks. Contrary to the other armies, all of its divisions had an organic tank unit. These were, however, largely equipped with light Vickers Mark VIs with a limited anti-tank capacity. A single heavy tank brigade was present, operating seventy-four Matilda I and Matilda II tanks that were better armoured than any German type of the period.

=== German forces ===
Army Group B was commanded by Fedor von Bock. It was allocated 26 infantry and three Panzer divisions for the invasion of the Netherlands and Belgium. Of the three Panzer divisions, the 3rd and 4th were to operate in Belgium under the command of the 6th Army's XVI Corps. The 9th Panzer Division was attached to the 18th Army which, after the Battle of the Netherlands, would support the push into Belgium alongside the 18th Army and cover the army group's northern flank.

Armoured strength in Army Group B amounted to 808 tanks, of which 282 were Panzer Is, 288 were Panzer IIs, 123 were Panzer IIIs and 66 were Panzer IVs; 49 command tanks were also operational. The 3rd Panzer Division's two armoured regiments consisted of 117 Panzer Is, 128 Panzer IIs, 42 Panzer IIIs, 26 Panzer IVs and 27 command tanks. The 4th Panzer Division had 136 Panzer Is, 105 Panzer IIs, 40 Panzer IIIs, 24 Panzer IVs and 10 command tanks. The 9th Panzer, scheduled initially for operations in the Netherlands, was the weakest armoured division in the German army with only a single tank regiment fielding 30 Panzer Is, 54 Panzer IIs, 123, 66 Panzer IIIs and 49 Panzer IVs.

The elements drawn from the 7th Air Division and the 22nd Airlanding Division (units largely ear-marked for landings in Holland), that were to take part in the attack on Fort Eben-Emael, were named Sturmabteilung Koch (Assault Detachment Koch); named after the commanding officer of the group, Hauptmann Walter Koch. The force was assembled in November 1939. It was primarily composed of parachutists from the 1st Parachute Regiment and engineers from the 7th Air Division, as well as a small group of Luftwaffe pilots. The Luftwaffe allocated 1,815 combat planes, 487 transport aircraft and 50 gliders for the assault on the Low Countries.

The initial air strikes over Belgian air space were to be conducted by IV. Fliegerkorps under General der Flieger Generaloberst Alfred Keller. Keller's force consisted of Lehrgeschwader 1 (Stab. I., II., III., IV.), Kampfgeschwader 30 (Stab. I., II., III.) and Kampfgeschwader 27 (III.). On 10 May Keller had 363 aircraft (224 serviceable) augmented by Generalmajor Wolfram von Richthofen's VIII. Fliegerkorps with 550 (420 serviceable) aircraft. They in turn were supported by Oberst Kurt-Bertram von Döring's Jagdfliegerführer 2, with 462 fighters (313 serviceable).

Keller's IV. Fliegerkorps headquarters would operate from Düsseldorf, LG 1. Kampfgeschwader 30 which was based at Oldenburg and its III. Gruppe were based at Marx. Support for Döring and Richthofen came from present-day North Rhine-Westphalia and bases in Grevenbroich, Mönchengladbach, Dortmund and Essen.

== Battle ==
=== Luftwaffe operations: 10 May ===
During the evening of 9 May, the Belgian military attaché in Berlin intimated that the Germans intended to attack the following day. Offensive movements of enemy forces were detected on the border. At 00:10 on 10 May 1940 at general headquarters, an unspecified squadron in Brussels gave the alarm. A full state of alert was instigated at 01:30. Belgian forces took up their deployment positions. The Allied armies enacted their Dyle Plan on the morning of 10 May, and were approaching the Belgian rear.

The Luftwaffe was to spearhead the aerial battle in the Low Countries. Its first task was to eliminate the Belgian air contingent. Despite an overwhelming numerical superiority — 1,375 aircraft, 957 of which were serviceable — the air campaign in Belgium had limited success overall on the first day. At roughly 04:00, the first air raids were conducted against airfields and communication centres. It still had a tremendous impact on the AéMI, which had only 179 aircraft on 10 May.

Much of the success achieved was down to Richthofen's subordinates, particularly Kampfgeschwader 77 and its commander Oberst Johann-Volkmar Fisser, whose attachment to VIII. Fliegerkorps was noted by Generalmajor Wilhelm Speidel. He commented it "...was the result of the well-known tendency of the commanding general to conduct his own private war". Fisser's KG 77 destroyed the AéMI main bases, with help from KG 54. Fighters from Jagdgeschwader 27 (JG 27) eliminated two Belgian squadrons at Neerhespen, and during the afternoon, I./St.G 2 destroyed nine of the 15 Fiat CR.42 fighters at Brustem. At Schaffen-Diest, three Hawker Hurricanes of Escadrille 2/I/2 were destroyed and another six damaged when a wave of He 111s caught them as they were about to take off. A further two were lost in destroyed hangars. At Nivelles airfield, 13 CR42s were destroyed. The only other success was KG 27s destruction of eight aircraft at Belsele.

In aerial combat the battles were also one-sided. Two He 111s, two Do 17s and three Messerschmitt Bf 109s were shot down by Gloster Gladiators and Hurricanes. In return, eight Belgian Gladiators, five Fairey Foxes and one CR42 were shot down by JG 1, 21 and 27. No. 18 Squadron RAF sent two Bristol Blenheims on operations over the Belgian front, but lost both to Bf 109s. By the end of 10 May, the official German figures indicate claims for 30 Belgian aircraft destroyed on the ground, and 14 (plus the two RAF bombers) in the air for 10 losses. The victory claims are likely an undercount. A total of 83 Belgian machines–mostly trainers and "squadron hacks", were destroyed. The AéMI flew only 146 sorties in the first six days. Between 16 May and 28 May, the AéMI flew just 77 operations. It spent most of its time retreating and fuel withdrawing in the face of Luftwaffe attacks.

=== 10–11 May: Border battles ===
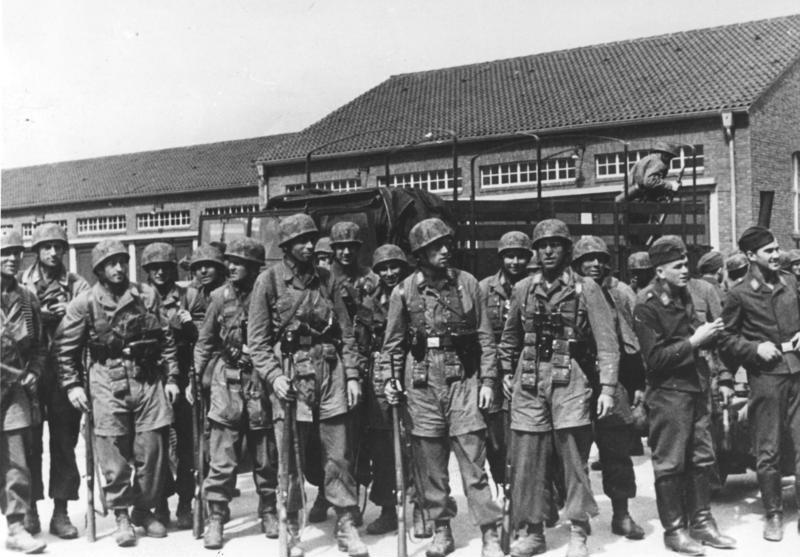
Fallschirmjäger of Sturmabteilung Koch pose for a photograph after the capture of Fort Eben-Emael.

The German planners had recognised the need to eliminate Fort Eben-Emael if their army was to break into the interior of Belgium. It decided to deploy airborne forces (Fallschirmjäger) to land on top of the fortress using Military gliders. Using special explosives and flamethrowers to disable the defences, the Fallschirmjäger entered the fortress. In the ensuing battle, German infantry overcame the defenders of the I Belgian Corps' 7th Infantry Division in 24 hours. The main Belgian defence line was breached and German infantry of the 18th Army rapidly passed through it. Moreover, German soldiers established bridgeheads across the Albert Canal before the British were able to reach it some 48 hours later. The Chasseurs Ardennais further south, on the orders of their commander, withdrew behind the Meuse, destroying some bridges in their wake. German airborne forces were assisted by Junkers Ju 87 Stukas of III./Sturzkampfgeschwader 2 (StG 2) and I./Sturzkampfgeschwader 77 (StG 77) helped suppress the defences. Henschel Hs 123s of II.(S)./Lehrgeschwader 2 (LG 2) assisted in the capture of the bridges at Vroenhoven and Veldwezelt in the immediate area.

Further successful German airborne offensive operations were carried out in Luxembourg, seizing five crossings and communication routes into central Belgium. The offensive, carried out by 125 volunteers of the 34th Infantry Division under the command of Wenner Hedderich, achieved their missions by flying to their objectives using Fieseler Fi 156 Störche. The cost was the loss of five aircraft and 30 dead. With the fort breached, the Belgian 4th and 7th infantry divisions were confronted by the prospect of fighting an enemy on relatively sound terrain (for armour operations). The 7th Division, with its 2nd and 18th grenadier regiments and 2nd Carabineers, struggled to hold their positions and contain the German infantry on the west bank. The Belgian tactical units engaged in several counterattacks. At one point, at Briedgen, they succeeded in retaking the bridge and blowing it up. At the other points, Vroenhoven and Veldwezelt, the Germans had time to establish strong bridgeheads and repulsed the attacks.

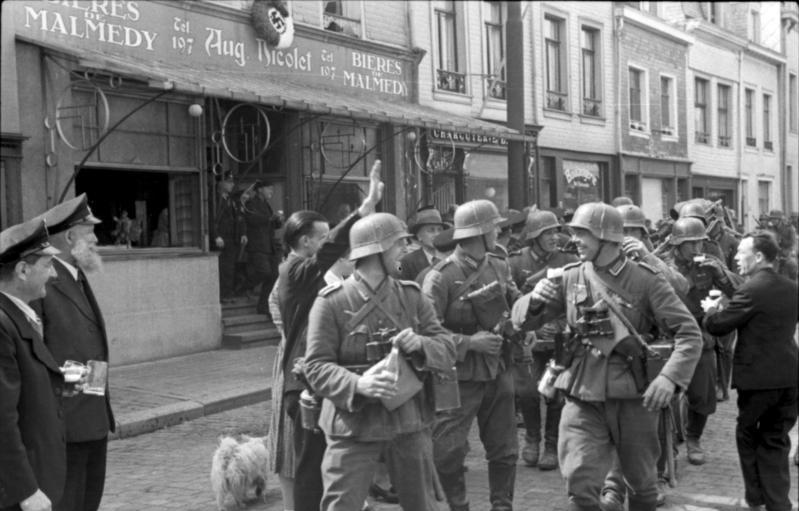
German soldiers are welcomed into Eupen-Malmedy, a German border region annexed by Belgium in the Treaty of Versailles (1919)

A little known third airborne operation, Operation Niwi, was also conducted on 10 May in southern Belgium. The objective of this operation was to land two companies of the 3rd battalion Grossdeutschland Infantry Regiment by Fi 156 aircraft at Nives and Witry in the south of Belgium, in order to clear a path for the 1st and 2nd Panzer divisions which were advancing through the Belgian–Luxembourg Ardennes. The original plan called for the use of Junkers Ju 52 transport aircraft, but the short landing capability of the Fi 156 (27 metres) saw 200 of these aircraft used in the assault. The operational mission was to:

1. Cut signal communications and message links on the Neufchâteau–Bastogne and Neufchâteau–Martelange roads. [Neufchâteau being the largest southernmost city in Belgium]
2. Prevent the approach of reserves from the Neufchâteau area
3. Facilitate the capture of pillboxes and the advance by exerting pressure against the line of pillboxes along the border from the rear.

The German infantry were engaged by several Belgian patrols equipped with T-15 armoured cars. Several Belgian counterattacks were repulsed, among them an attack by the 1st Light Chasseurs Ardennais Division. Unsupported, the Germans faced a counterattack later in the evening by elements of the French 5th Cavalry Division, dispatched by General Charles Huntziger from the French 2nd Army, which had a significant tank strength. The Germans were forced to retreat. The French, however, failed to pursue the fleeing German units, stopping at a dummy barrier. By the next morning, the 2nd Panzer Division had reached the area, and the mission had largely been accomplished. From the German perspective, the operation hindered rather than helped Heinz Guderian's Panzer Corps. The regiment had blocked the roads and, against the odds, prevented French reinforcements reaching the Belgian–Franco-Luxembourg border, but it also destroyed Belgian telephone communications. This inadvertently prevented the Belgian field command recalling the units along the border. The 1st Belgian Light Infantry did not receive the signal to retreat and engaged in a severe fire-fight with the German armour, slowing down their advance.

The failure of the Franco–Belgian forces to hold the Ardennes gap was fatal. The Belgians had withdrawn laterally upon the initial invasion and had demolished and blocked routes of advance, which held up the French 2nd Army units moving north toward Namur and Huy. Devoid of any centre of resistance, the German assault engineers had cleared the obstacles unchallenged. The delay that the Belgian Ardennes Light Infantry, considered to be an elite formation, could have inflicted upon the advancing German armour was proved by the fight for Bodange, where the 1st Panzer Division was held up for a total of eight hours. This battle was a result of a breakdown in communications and ran contrary to the operational intentions of the Belgian Army.

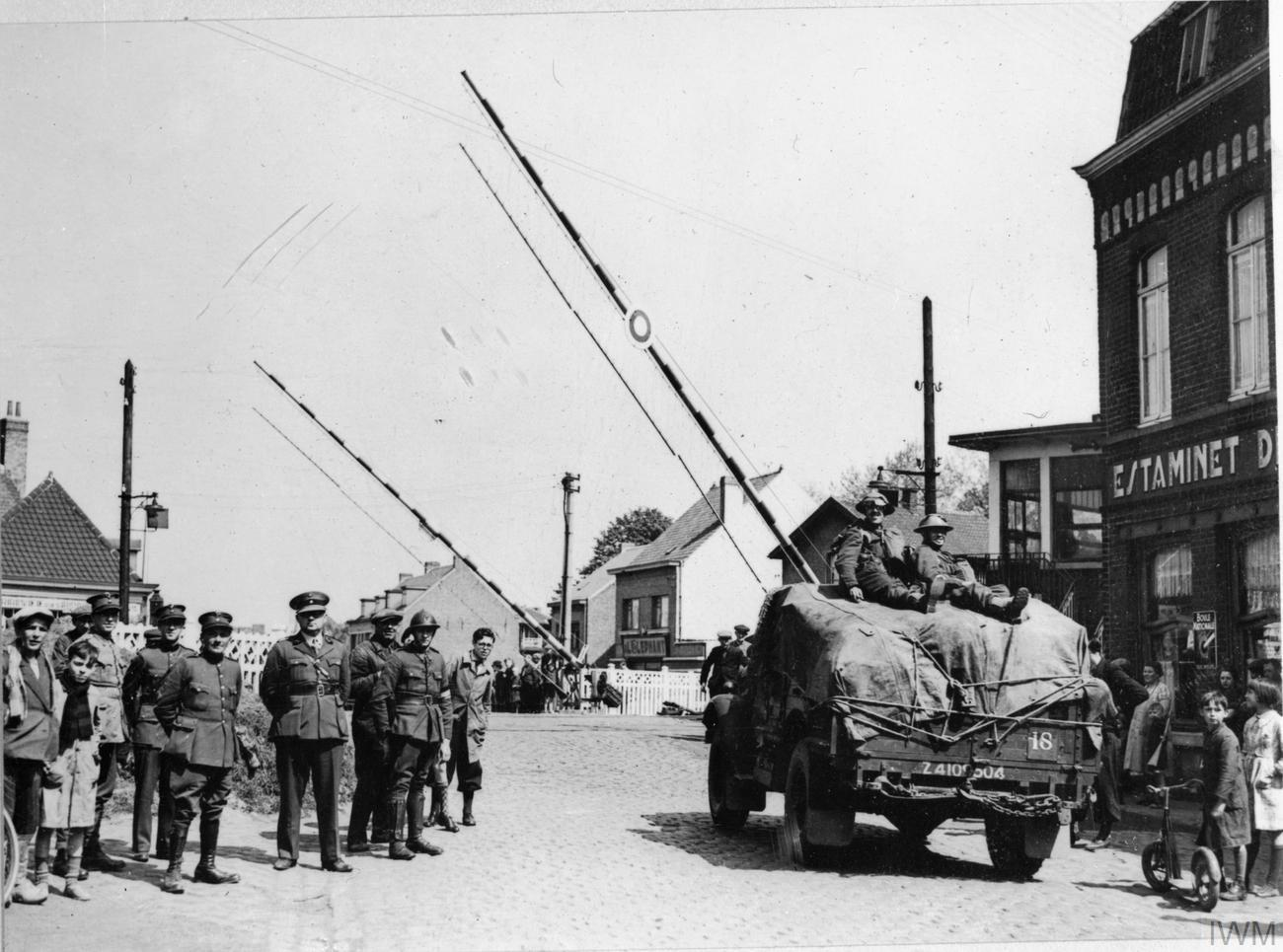
British troops cross the Franco-Belgian border at Herseaux on 10 May

Meanwhile, in the central Belgian sector, having failed to restore their front by means of ground attack, the Belgians attempted to bomb the bridges and positions that the Germans had captured intact and were holding on 11 May. Belgian Fairey Battles of 5/III/3 escorted by six Gloster Gladiators attacked the Albert Canal bridges. Bf 109s from I./Jagdgeschwader 1 (JG 1) and I./JG 27 intercepted and JG 1 shot down four Gladiators and both units destroyed six Battles and heavily damaged the remaining three. Eight CR.42s were evacuated from Brustem to Grimbergen near Brussels but seven Gladiators and the last remaining Hurricanes from 2/I/2 Escadrille were destroyed at Beauvechain Air Base and Le Culot by He 111s and I./JG 27 respectively. The RAF contributed to the effort to attack the bridges. The British dispatched Bristol Blenheims from 110 and 21 squadrons—the first squadron lost two, one to I./JG 27. 21 Squadron suffered damage to most of the bombers because of intense ground-fire. The French Armée de l'air dispatched LeO 451s from GBI/12 and GBII/12 escorted by 18 Morane-Saulnier M.S.406 of GCIII/3 and GCII/6. The operation failed and one bomber was lost while four M.S.406s fell to I./JG 1. The French claimed five. Meanwhile, 114 Squadron lost six Blenheims destroyed when Dornier Do 17s of Kampfgeschwader 2 bombed their airfield at Vraux. Another Battle of No. 150 Squadron RAF was lost in another raid.

The German counter-air operations were spearheaded by Jagdgeschwader 26 (JG 26) under the command of Hans-Hugo Witt, which was responsible for 82 of the German claims in aerial combat between 11 and 13 May. Despite the apparent success of the German fighter units, the air battle was not one-sided. On the morning of 11 May ten Ju 87s of StG 2 were shot down attacking Belgian forces in the Namur–Dinant gap, despite the presence of two Jagdgeschwader—27 and 51. Nevertheless, the Germans reported a weakening in Allied air resistance in northern Belgium by 13 May.

During the night of 11 May, the British 3rd Infantry Division under the command of General Bernard Montgomery reached its position on the Dyle river at Leuven. As it did so the Belgian 10th Infantry Division, occupying the position, mistook them for German parachutists and fired on them. The Belgians refused to yield but Montgomery claimed to have got his way by placing himself under the command of the Belgian forces, knowing that when the Germans came within artillery range the Belgians would withdraw.

Alan Brooke, commander of the British II Corps sought to put the matter of cooperation right with King Leopold. The King discussed the matter with Brooke, who felt a compromise could be reached. Van Overstraeten, the King's military aide, stepped in and said that the 10th Belgian Infantry Division could not be moved. Instead, the British should move further south and remain completely clear of Brussels. Brooke told the King that the 10th Belgian Division was on the wrong side of the Gamelin line and was exposed. Leopold deferred to his advisor and chief of staff. Brooke found Overstaeten to be ignorant of the situation and the dispositions of the BEF. Given that the left flank of the BEF rested on its Belgian ally, the British were now unsure about Belgian military capabilities. The Allies had more serious grounds for complaint about the Belgian anti-tank defences along the Dyle line, that covered the Namur–Perwez gap, which was not protected by any natural obstacles. Only a few days before the attack, General Headquarters had discovered the Belgians had sited their anti-tank defences (de Cointet defences) several miles east of the Dyle between Namur–Perwez.

After holding onto the Albert Canal's west bank for nearly 36 hours, the 4th and 7th Belgian infantry divisions withdrew. The capture of Eben-Emael allowed the Germans to force through the Panzers of the 6th Army. The situation for the Belgian divisions was either to withdraw or be encircled. The Germans had advanced beyond Tongeren and were now in a position to sweep south to Namur, which would threaten to envelop the entire Albert Canal and Liège positions. Under the circumstances, both divisions withdrew. On the evening of 11 May, the Belgian command withdrew its forces behind the Namur–Antwerp line. The following day, the French 1st Army arrived at Gembloux, between Wavre and Namur, to cover the "Gembloux gap". It was a flat area, devoid of prepared or entrenched positions.

The French 7th Army, on the northern flank of the Belgian line, protected the Bruges–Ghent–Ostend axis and, covering the Channel ports, had advanced into Belgium and into the Netherlands with speed. It reached Breda in the Netherlands, on 11 May. But German parachute forces had seized the Moerdijk bridge on the Hollands Diep river, south of Rotterdam, making it impossible for the French to link up with the Dutch Army. The Dutch Army withdrew north to Rotterdam and Amsterdam.

The French 7th Army turned east and met the 9th Panzer Division about 20 kilometres (12 mi) east of Breda at Tilburg. The battle resulted in the French retiring, in the face of Luftwaffe air assaults, to Antwerp. It would later help in the defence of the city. The Luftwaffe had given priority to attacking the French 7th Army's spearhead into the Netherlands as it threatened the Moerdijk bridgehead. Kampfgeschwader 40 and 54 supported by Ju 87s from VIII. Fliegerkorps helped drive them back. Fears of Allied reinforcements reaching Antwerp forced the Luftwaffe to cover the Scheldt estuary. KG 30 bombed and sank two Dutch gunboats and three Dutch destroyers, as well as badly damaging two Royal Navy destroyers. Overall the bombing had a limited effect.

=== 12–14 May: Battles of the central Belgian plain ===
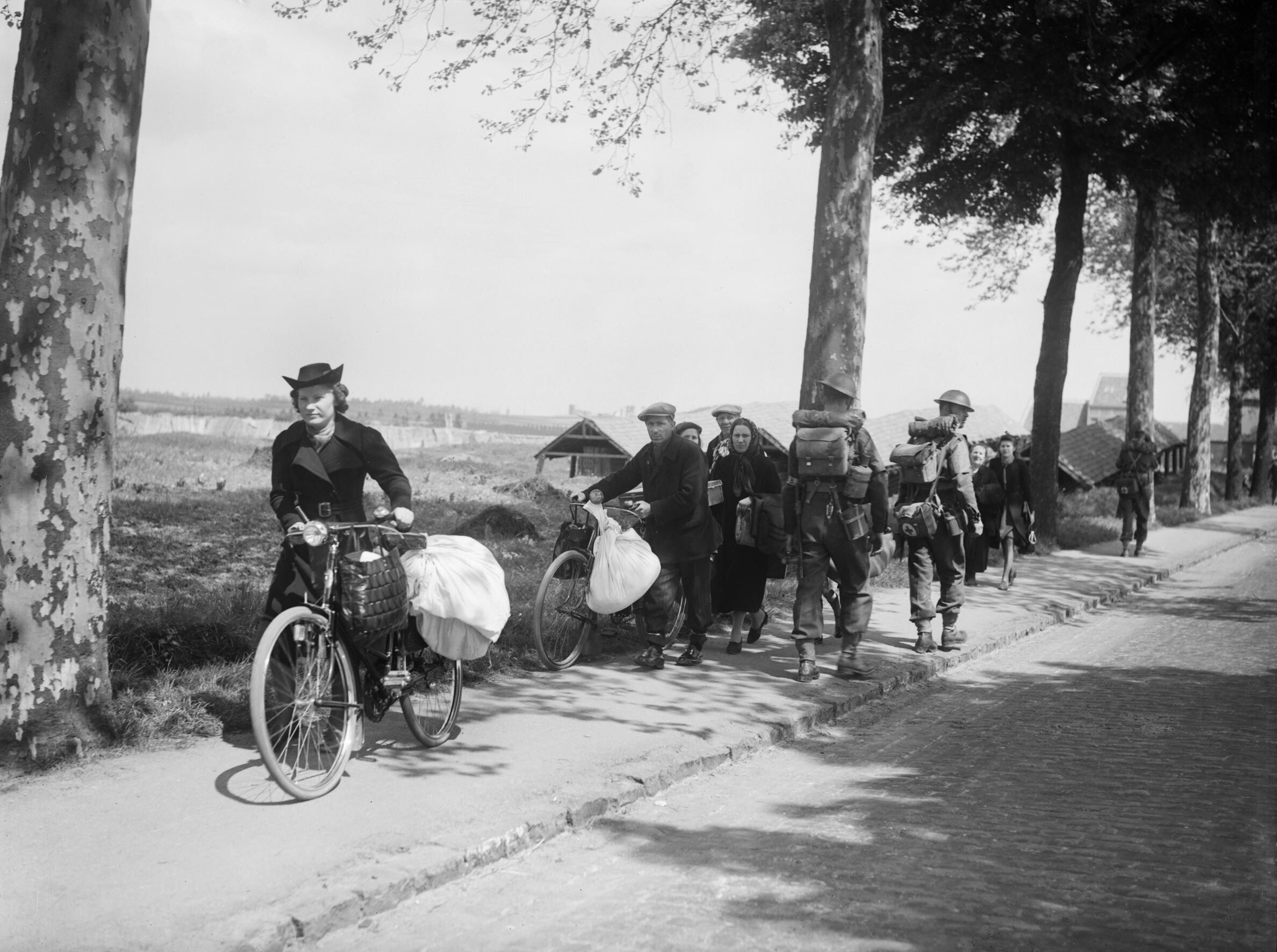
Belgian civilians fleeing westwards away from the advancing German army, 12 May 1940

During the night of 11/12 May, the Belgians were fully engaged in withdrawing to the Dyle line, covered by a network of demolitions and rearguards astride Tongeren. During the morning of 12 May, King Leopold III, General van Overstraeten, Édouard Daladier, General Alphonse Georges (commander of the First Allied army Group, comprising the BEF, French 1st, 2nd, 7th and 9th armies), General Billotte (coordinator of the Allied armies) and General Henry Royds Pownall, Gort's chief of staff, met for a military conference near Mons. It was agreed the Belgian Army would man the Antwerp–Leuven line, while its allies took up the responsibility of defending the extreme north and south of the country.

The Belgian III Corps, and its 1st Chasseurs Ardennais, 2nd Infantry and 3rd Infantry divisions had withdrawn from the Liège fortifications to avoid being encircled. One regiment, the Liège Fortress Regiment, stayed behind to disrupt German communications. Further to the south, the Namur fortress, manned by VI Corps' 5th Infantry Division and the 2nd Chasseurs Ardennais with the 12th French Infantry Division, fought delaying actions and participated in a lot of demolition work while guarding the position. As far as the Belgians were concerned, they had accomplished the only independent mission assigned to it: to hold the Liège–Albert Canal line long enough for the Allied units to reach friendly forces occupying the Namur–Antwerp–Givet line. For the remainder of the campaign, the Belgians would execute their operations in accordance with the overall Allied plan.

Belgian soldiers fought rearguard actions while other Belgian units already on the Dyle line worked tirelessly to organise better defensive positions in the Leuven–Antwerp gap. The 2nd Regiment of Guides and the 2nd Carabineers Cyclists of the 2nd Belgian Cavalry Division covered the retreat of the 4th and 7th Belgian divisions and were particularly distinguished at the Battle of Tirlemont and the Battle of Halen.

In support of Belgian forces in the area, the RAF and French flew air defence operations in the Tirlemont and Louvain area. The 'RAF Advanced Air Striking Force' committed 3, 504, 79, 57, 59, 85, 87, 605, and 242 squadrons to battle. A series of air battles were fought with JG 1, 2, 26, 27 and 3. Messerschmitt Bf 110s from Zerstörergeschwader 26 (ZG 26), and bomber units LG 1, 2 and KG 27 were also involved. Over Belgium and France, the day was disastrous for the British: 27 Hurricanes were shot down. In light of the withdrawal to the main defensive line, which was now being supported by the British and French armies, King Leopold issued the following proclamation to improve morale after the defeats at the Albert Canal:

Soldiers
The Belgian Army, brutally assailed by an unparalleled surprise attack, grappling with forces that are better equipped and have the advantage of a formidable air force, has for three days carried out difficult operations, the success of which is of the utmost importance to the general conduct of the battle and to the result of war.
These operations require from all of us – officers and men – exceptional efforts, sustained day and night, despite a moral tension tested to its limits by the sight of the devastation wrought by a pitiless invader. However severe the trial may be, you will come through it gallantly.
Our position improves with every hour; our ranks are closing up. In the critical days that are ahead of us, you will summon up all your energies, you will make every sacrifice, to stem the invasion.
Just as they did in 1914 on the Yser, so now the French and British troops are counting on you: the safety and honour of the country are in your hands.
Leopold.

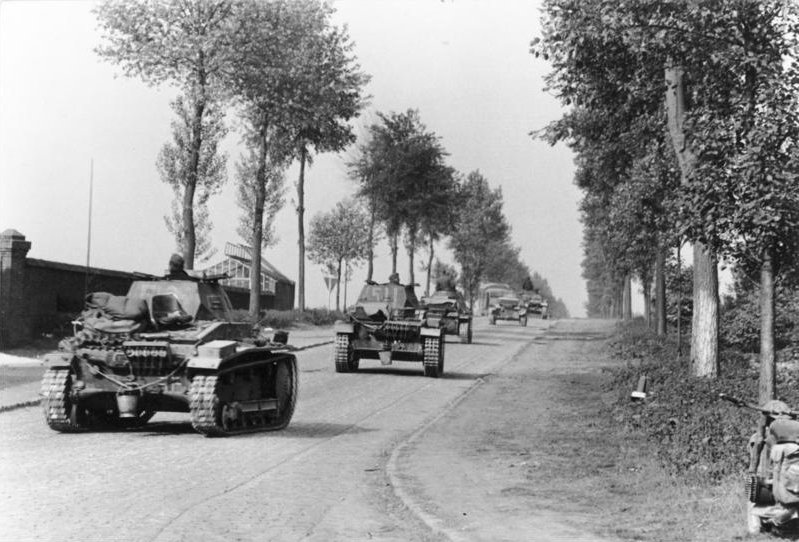
German Panzer II tanks in western Belgium, May 1940

To the Allies, the Belgian failure to hold onto its eastern frontiers (they were thought to be capable of holding out for two weeks), was a disappointment. The Allied chiefs of staff had sought to avoid an encounter mobile battle without any strong fixed defences to fall back on and hoped Belgian resistance would last long enough for a defensive line to be established. Nevertheless, a brief lull fell on the Dyle front on 11 May which enabled the Allied armies to get into position by the time the first major assault was launched the following day. Allied cavalry had moved into position and infantry and artillery were reaching the front more slowly, by rail. Although unaware of it, the First Allied Army Group and the Belgian Army outnumbered and outgunned Walther von Reichenau's German 6th Army.

On the morning of 12 May, in response to Belgian pressure and necessity, the Royal Air Force and the Armée de l'Air undertook several air attacks on the German-held Maastricht and Meuse bridges to prevent German forces flowing into Belgium. Seventy-four sorties had been flown by the Allies since 10 May. On 12 May, eleven out of eighteen French Breguet 693 bombers were shot down. The RAF Advanced Air Striking Force, which included the largest Allied bomber force, was reduced to 72 aircraft out of 135 by 12 May. For the next 24 hours, missions were postponed as the German anti-aircraft and fighter defences were too strong.

The results of the bombing are difficult to determine. The German XIX Corps war diary's situation summary at 20:00 on 14 May noted:

The completion of the military bridge at Donchery had not yet been carried out owing to heavy flanking artillery fire and long bombing attacks on the bridging point ... Throughout the day all three divisions have had to endure constant air attack — especially at the crossing and bridging points. Our fighter cover is inadequate. Requests [for increased fighter protection] are still unsuccessful.

The Luftwaffe's operations includes a note of "vigorous enemy fighter activity through which our close reconnaissance in particular is severely impeded". Nevertheless, inadequate protection was given to cover RAF bombers against the strength of German opposition over the target area. In all, out of 109 Battles and Blenheims which had attacked enemy columns and communications in the Sedan area, 45 had been lost. On 15 May, daylight bombing was significantly reduced. Of 23 aircraft employed, four failed to return. Equally, owing to the Allied fighter presence, the German XIX Corps War Diary states, "Corps no longer has at its disposal its own long-range reconnaissance ... [Reconnaissance squadrons] are no longer in a position to carry out vigorous, extensive reconnaissance, as, owing to casualties, more than half of their aircraft are not now available."

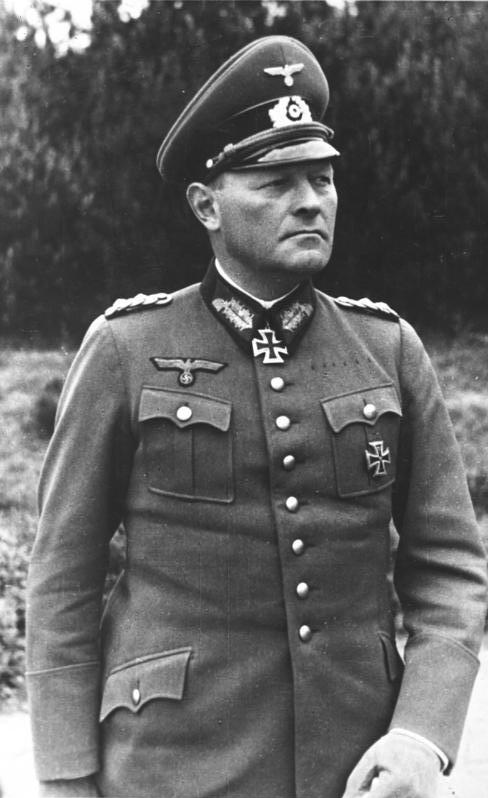
General Erich Hoepner commanded XVI Army Corps at the Battle of Hannut and the Gembloux gap offensive

The most serious combat to evolve on 12 May 1940 was the beginning of the Battle of Hannut (12–14 May). While the German Army Group A advanced through the Belgian Ardennes, Army Group B's 6th Army launched an offensive operation toward the Gembloux gap. Gembloux occupied a position in the Belgian plain; it was an unfortified, untrenched space in the main Belgian defensive line. The gap stretched from the southern end of the Dyle line, from Wavre in the north, to Namur in the south, 20 kilometres (12 mi) to 30 kilometres (19 mi). After attacking out of the Maastricht bulge and defeating the Belgian defences at Liège, which compelled the Belgian I Corps to retreat, the German 6th Army's XVI Panzer-Motorized Corps, under the command of General Erich Hoepner and containing the 3rd and 4th Panzer divisions, launched an offensive in the area where the French mistakenly expected the main German thrust.

The Gembloux gap was defended by the French 1st Army, with six elite divisions including the 2nd (2e Division Légère Mécanique, or 2^{e} DLM) and 3rd light mechanized divisions. The Prioux Cavalry Corps, under the command of Prioux, was to advance 30 kilometres (19 mi) beyond the line (east) to provide a screen for the move. The French 1st and 2nd armoured divisions were to be moved behind the French 1st Army to defend its main lines in depth. The Prioux Cavalry Corps was equal to a German Panzer corps and was to occupy a screening line on the Tirlemont–Hannut–Huy axis. The operational plan called for the corps to delay the German advance on Gembloux and Hannut until the main elements of the French 1st Army had reached Gembloux and dug in.

Hoepner's Panzer Corps and Prioux' cavalry clashed head-on near Hannut, Belgium, on 12 May. Contrary to popular belief, the Germans did not outnumber the French. Frequently, figures of 623 German and 415 French tanks are given. The German 3rd and 4th Panzer divisions numbered 280 and 343 respectively. The 2^{e} DLM and 3^{e} DLM numbered 176 Somuas and 239 Hotchkiss H35s. Added to this force were the considerable number of Renault AMR-ZT-63s in the Cavalry Corps. The R35 was equal or superior to the Panzer I and Panzer IIs in armament terms. This applies all the more to the 90 Panhard 178 armoured cars of the French Army. Its 25 mm main gun could penetrate the armour of the Panzer IV. In terms of tanks that were capable of engaging and surviving a tank-vs-tank action, the Germans possessed just 73 Panzer IIIs and 52 Panzer IVs. The French had 176 SOMUA and 239 Hotchkisses. German tank units also contained 486 Panzer I and IIs, which were of dubious combat value given their losses in the Polish Campaign.

The German forces were able to communicate by radio during the battle and they could shift the point of the main effort unexpectedly. The Germans also practiced combined arms tactics, while the French tactical deployment was a rigid and linear leftover from the First World War. French tanks did not possess radios and often the commanders had to dismount to issue orders. Despite the disadvantages experienced by the Germans in armour, they were able to gain the upper hand in the morning battle on 12 May, encircling several French battalions. The combat power of the French 2^{e} DLM managed to defeat the German defences guarding the pockets and freeing the trapped units. Contrary to German reports, the French were victorious on that first day, preventing a Wehrmacht break-through to Gembloux or seizing Hannut. The result of the first day's battle was:

The effect on the German light tanks was catastrophic. Virtually every French weapon from 25mm upward penetrated the 7-13 mm of the Panzer I. Although the Panzer II fared somewhat better, especially those that had been up-armoured since the Polish Campaign, their losses were high. Such was the sheer frustration of the crews of these light Panzers in [the] face of heavier armoured French machines that some resorted to desperate expedients. One account speaks of a German Panzer commander attempting to climb on a Hotchkiss H-35 with a hammer, presumably to smash the machine's periscopes, but falling off and being crushed by the tank's tracks. Certainly by day's end, Prioux had reason to claim that his tanks had come off best. The battlefield around Hannut was littered with knocked-out tanks–the bulk of which were German Panzers–with by far and away the bulk of them being Panzer Is and IIs.

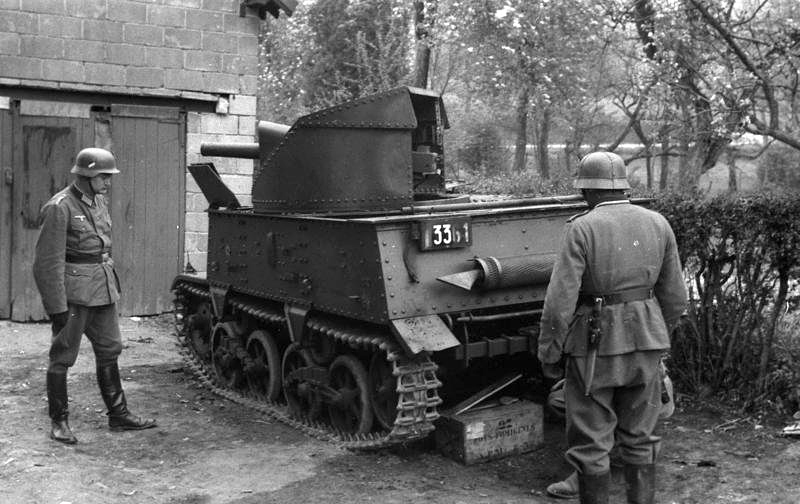
German soldiers inspecting an abandoned Belgian T-13 tank destroyer

The following day, 13 May, the French were undone by their poor tactical deployment. They strung their armour out in a thin line between Hannut and Huy, leaving no defence in depth, which was the point of sending the French armour to the Gembloux gap in the first place. This left Hoepner with a chance to mass against one of the French light divisions (the 3^{e} DLM) and achieve a breakthrough in that sector. Moreover, with no reserves behind the front, the French denied themselves the chance of a counterattack. The victory saw the Panzer corps out-manoeuvre the 2^{e} DLM on its left flank. The Belgian III Corps, retreating from Liège, offered to support the French front held by the 3^{e} DLM. This offer was rejected.

On 12 and 13 May, 2^{e} DLM lost no AFVs, but the 3^{e} DLM lost 30 SOMUAs and 75 Hotchkisses. The French had disabled 160 German tanks. But as the poor linear deployment had allowed the Germans the chance of breaking through in one spot, the entire battlefield had to be abandoned, the Germans repaired nearly three-quarters of their tanks; 49 were destroyed and 111 were repaired. They had 60 men killed and another 80 wounded. In terms of battlefield casualties, the Hannut battle had resulted in the French knocking-out 160 German tanks, losing 105 themselves. Prioux had achieved his tactical mission and withdrew.

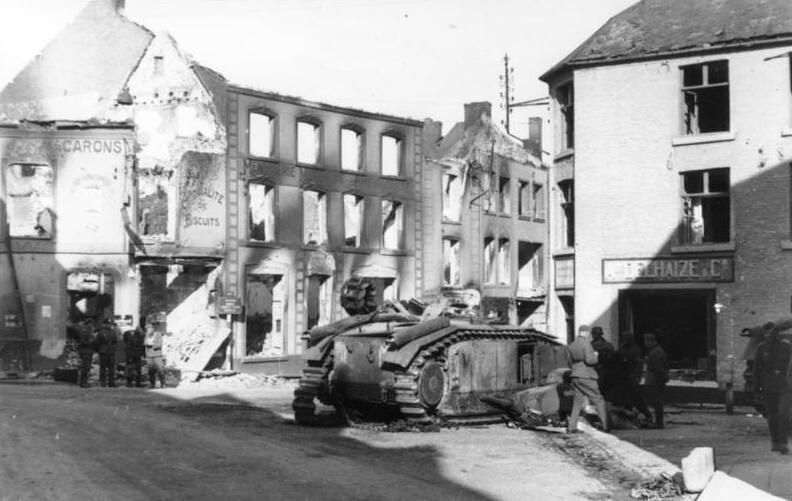
Destroyed French tanks in Beaumont on 16 May

Hoepner now pursued the retreating French. Being impatient, he did not wait for his infantry divisions to catch up. Instead, he hoped to continue pushing the French back and not give them time to construct a coherent defence line. German formations pursued the enemy to Gembloux. The Panzer Corps ran into retreating French columns and inflicted heavy losses on them. The pursuit created severe problems for the French artillery. The combat was so closely fought that the danger of friendly fire incidents were very real. Nevertheless, the French, setting up new anti-tank screens and Hoepner, lacking infantry support, caused the Germans to attack positions head-on. During the following Battle of Gembloux the two Panzer divisions reported heavy losses during 14 May and were forced to slow their pursuit. The German attempts to capture Gembloux were repulsed.

Although suffering numerous tactical reverses, operationally the Germans diverted the Allied First Army Group from the lower Ardennes area. In the process his forces, along with the Luftwaffe depleted Prioux' Cavalry Corps. When news of the German breakthrough at Sedan reached Prioux, he withdrew from Gembloux. With the Gembloux gap breached, the German Panzer Corps, the 3rd and 4th Panzer divisions, were no longer required by Army Group B and were handed over to Army Group A. Army Group B would continue its own offensive to force the collapse of the Meuse front. The army group was in a position to advance westward to Mons, outflank the BEF and Belgian Army protecting the Dyle–Brussels sector, or turn south to outflank the French 9th Army. German losses had been heavy at Hannut and Gembloux. The 4th Panzer Division was down to 137 tanks on 16 May, including just four Panzer IVs. The 3rd Panzer Division was down by 20–25 percent of its operational force; for the 4th Panzer Division 45–50 percent of its tanks were not combat ready. Damaged tanks were quickly repaired, but its strength was initially greatly weakened. The French 1st Army had also taken a battering and despite winning several tactical defensive victories it was forced to retreat on 15 May owing to developments elsewhere, leaving its tanks on the battlefield, while the Germans were free to recover theirs.

=== 15–21 May: Counterattacks and retreat to the coast ===
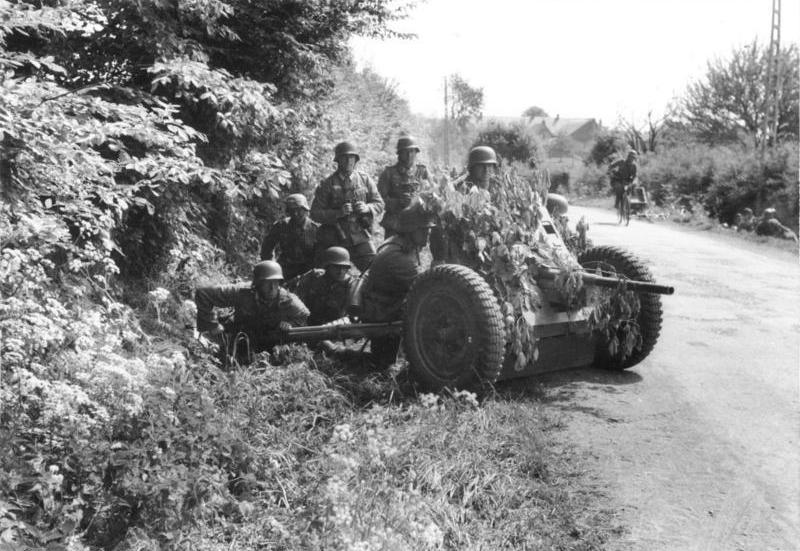
German infantry with a Pak 36 anti-tank gun in western Belgium in May 1940

On the morning of 15 May, German Army Group A broke the defences at Sedan and was now free to drive for the English Channel. The Allies considered a wholesale withdrawal from the Belgian trap. The withdrawal would reflect three stages: the night of 16/17 May to the River Senne, the night of 17/18 May to the river Dendre and the night of 18/19 May to the river Scheldt. The Belgians were reluctant to abandon Brussels and Leuven, especially as the Dyle line had withstood German pressure well. The Belgian Army, the BEF and the French 1st Army, in a domino effect, was ordered/forced to retire on 16 May to avoid their southern flanks from being turned by the German armoured forces advancing through the French Ardennes and the German 6th Army advancing through Gembloux. The Belgian Army was holding the German Fourteenth Army on the KW-line, along with the French 7th and British armies. Had it not been for the collapse of the French 2nd Army at Sedan, the Belgians were confident that they could have checked the German advance.

The situation called for the French and British to abandon the Antwerp–Namur line and strong positions in favour of improvised positions behind the Scheldt, without facing any real resistance. In the south, General Deffontaine of the Belgian VII Corps retreated from the Namur and Liège regions, the Liège fortress region put up stiff resistance to the German 6th Army. In the north, the 7th Army was diverted to Antwerp after the surrender of the Dutch on 15 May, but was then diverted to support the French 1st Army. In the centre, the Belgian Army and the BEF suffered little German pressure. On 15 May, the only sector to really be tested was around Leuven, which was held by the British 3rd Division. The BEF was not pursued vigorously to the Scheldt.

After the withdrawal of the French Army from the northern sector, the Belgians were left to guard the fortified city of Antwerp. Four infantry divisions (including the 13th and 17th reserve infantry divisions) engaged the German Eighteenth Army's 208th, 225th and 526th infantry divisions. The Belgians successfully defended the northern part of the city, delaying the German infantry forces while starting to withdraw from Antwerp on 16 May. The city fell on 18/19 May after considerable Belgian resistance. On 18 May the Belgians received word that Namur's Fort Marchovelette had fallen; Suarlee fell on 19 May; St. Heribert and Malonne on 21 May; Dave, Maizeret and Andoy on 23 May.

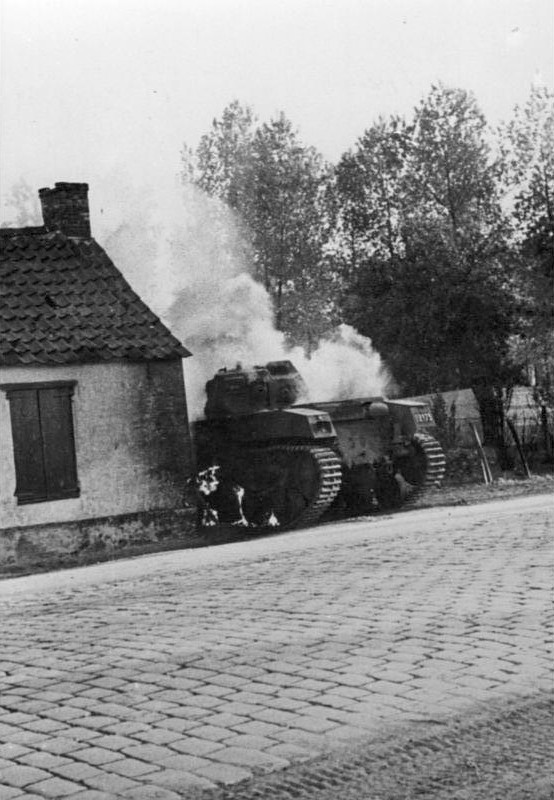
A Belgian Renault ACG1 tank, knocked out during the Battle for Antwerp, 19 May 1940

Between 16 and 17 May, the British and French withdrew behind the Willebroek Canal, as the volume of Allied forces in Belgium fell and moved toward the German armoured thrust from the Ardennes. The Belgian I Corps and V Corps also retreated to what the Belgians called the Ghent bridgehead, behind the rivers Dender and Scheldt. The Belgian Artillery Corps and its infantry support defeated attacks by the Eighteenth Army's infantry and in a communiqué from London, the British recognized the "Belgian Army has contributed largely toward the success of the defensive battle now being fought. Nevertheless, the now-outnumbered Belgians abandoned Brussels and the Government fled to Ostend. The city was occupied by the German Army on 17 May. The very next morning, Hoepner, the German XVI Corps commander, was ordered to release the 3rd and 4th Panzer Divisions to Army Group A. This left the 9th Panzer Division attached to the Eighteenth Army as the only armoured unit on the Belgian front.

By 19 May, the Germans were hours away from reaching the French Channel coast. Gort had discovered the French had neither plan nor reserves and little hope for stopping the German thrust to the channel. He was concerned that the French 1st Army on its southern flank had been reduced to a disorganized mass of "fag-ends", fearing that German armour might appear on their right flank at Arras, or Péronne, striking for the channel ports at Calais or Boulogne or north west into the British flank. Their position in Belgium massively compromised, the BEF considered abandoning Belgium and retreating to Ostend, Bruges or Dunkirk, the latter lying some 10 kilometres (6.2 mi) to 15 kilometres (9.3 mi) inside the French border.

The proposal of a British strategic withdrawal from the continent was rejected by the War Cabinet and the Chief of the Imperial General Staff (CIGS). They dispatched General Ironside to inform Gort of their decision and to order him to conduct an offensive to the south-west "through all opposition" to reach the "main French forces" in the south [the strongest French forces were actually in the north]. The Belgian Army was asked to conform to the plan, or should they choose, the British Royal Navy would evacuate what units they could. The British cabinet decided that even if the "Somme offensive" was carried out successfully, some units may still need to be evacuated, and ordered Admiral Ramsay to assemble a large number of vessels. This was the beginning of Operation Dynamo. Ironside arrived at British General Headquarters at 06:00 am on 20 May, the same day that continental communications between France and Belgium was cut. When Ironside made his proposals known to Gort, Gort replied such an attack was impossible. Seven of his nine divisions were engaged on the Scheldt and even if it was possible to withdraw them, it would create a gap between the Belgians and British which the enemy could exploit and encircle the former. The BEF had been marching and fighting for nine days and was now running short of ammunition. The main effort had to be made by the French to the south.

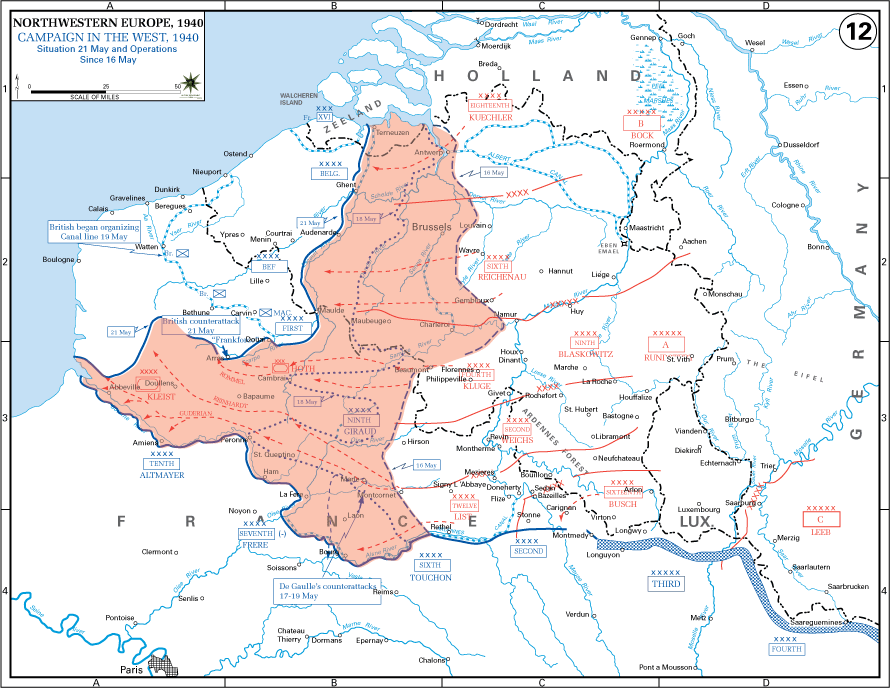
Strategic situation in Belgium and France on 21 May

The Belgian position on any offensive move was made clear by Leopold III. As far as he was concerned, the Belgian Army could not conduct offensive operations as it lacked tanks and aircraft; it existed solely for defence. The King also made clear that in the rapidly shrinking area of Belgium still free, there was only enough food for two weeks. Leopold did not expect the BEF to jeopardize its own position in order to keep contact with the Belgian Army, but he warned the British that if it persisted with the southern offensive the Belgians would be overstretched and their army would collapse. King Leopold suggested the best recourse was to establish a beach-head covering Dunkirk and the Belgian channel ports. The will of the CIGS won out. Gort committed just two infantry battalions and the only armoured battalion in the BEF to the attack, which despite some initial tactical success, failed to break the German defensive line at the Battle of Arras on 21 May.

In the aftermath of this failure, the Belgians were asked to fall back to the Yser river and protect the Allied left flank and rear areas. The King's aide, General Overstraten, said that such a move could not be made and would lead to the Belgian Army disintegrating. Another plan for further offensives was suggested. The French requested the Belgians withdraw to the Leie and the British to the French frontier between Maulde and Halluin, the Belgians were then to extend their front to free further parts of the BEF for the attack. The French 1st Army would relieve two more divisions on the right flank. Leopold was reluctant to undertake such a move because it would abandon all but a small portion of Belgium. The Belgian Army was exhausted and it was an enormous technical task that would take too long to complete.

At this time, the Belgians and the British concluded that the French were beaten and the Allied armies in the pocket on the Belgian–Franco border would be destroyed if action was not taken. The British, having lost confidence in their allies, decided to look to the survival of the BEF.

=== 22–28 May: Last defensive battles ===
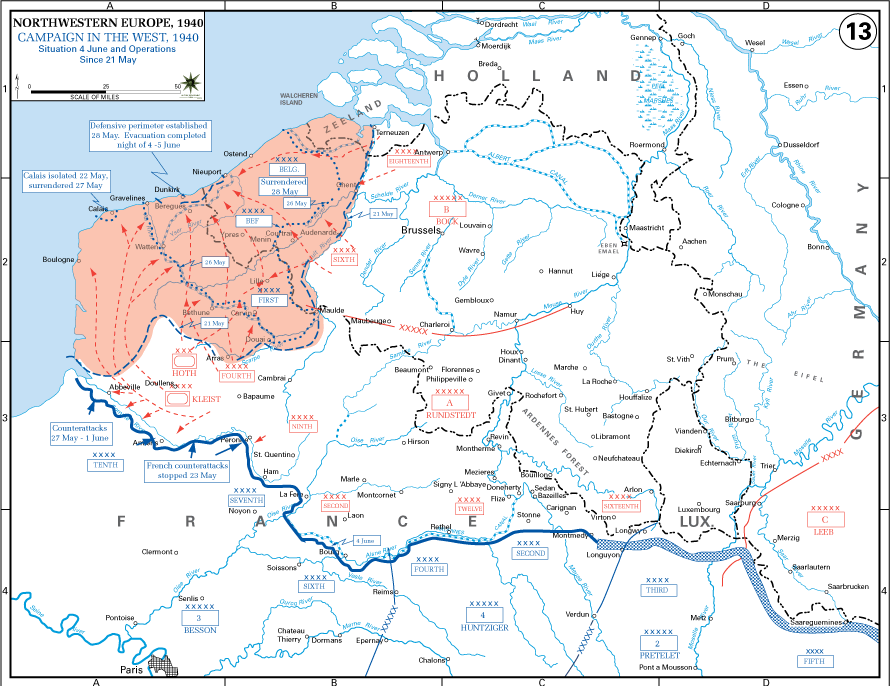
The Germans advance to the English Channel after 21 May.

The Belgian battle-front on the morning of 22 May extended some 90 kilometres (56 mi) from north to south, beginning with the Cavalry Corps, which checked its advance at Terneuzen. V, II, VI, VII and IV corps (all Belgian) were drawn up side by side. Two further signal corps were guarding the coast. These formations were then largely holding the eastern front as the BEF and French forces withdrew to the west to protect Dunkirk, which was vulnerable to German assault on 22 May. The eastern front remained intact, but the Belgians now occupied their last fortified position at Leie. The Belgian I Corps, with only two incomplete divisions, had been heavily engaged in the fighting and their line was wearing thin. On that day, Winston Churchill visited the front and pressed for the French and British armies to break out from the north-east. He assumed that the Belgian Cavalry Corps could support the offensives' right flank. Churchill dispatched the following message to Gort:

1. That the Belgian Army should withdraw to the line of the Yser and stand there, the sluices being opened.
2. That the British Army and French 1st Army should attack south-west toward Bapaume and Cambrai at the earliest moment, certainly tomorrow, with about eight divisions, and with the Belgian Cavalry Corps on the right of the British.

Such an order ignored the fact that the Belgian Army could not withdraw to the Yser, and there was little chance of any Belgian Cavalry joining in the attack. The plan for the Belgian withdrawal was sound; the Yser river covered Dunkirk to the east and south, while the La Bassée Canal covered it from the west. The ring of the Yser also dramatically shorted the Belgian Army's area of operations. Such a move would have abandoned Passchendaele and Ypres and would have certainly meant the capture of Ostend while further reducing the amount of Belgian territory still free by a few square miles.

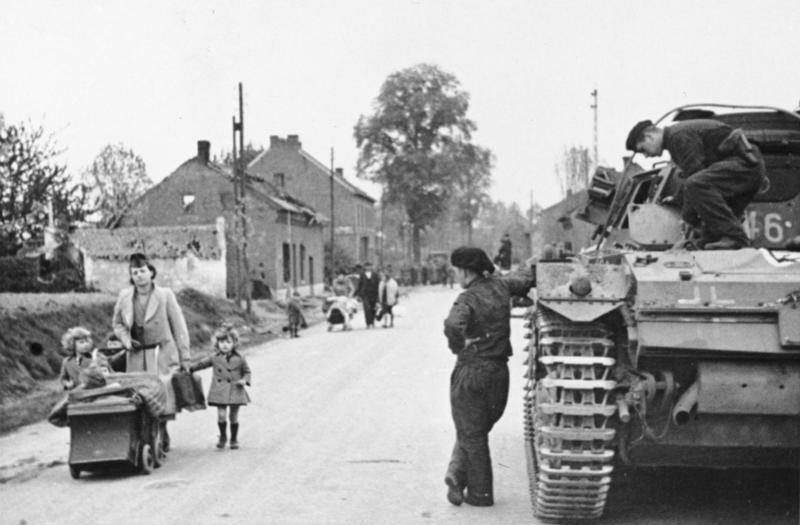
German troops watch Belgian civilian refugees fleeing the fighting

On 23 May, the French tried to conduct a series of offensives against the German defensive line on the Ardennes–Calais axis but failed to make any meaningful gains. Meanwhile, on the Belgian front, the Belgians, under pressure, retreated further, and the Germans captured Terneuzen and Ghent that day. The Belgians also had trouble moving the oil, food and ammunition that they had left. The Luftwaffe had air superiority and made everyday life hazardous in logistical terms. Air support could only be called in by "wireless" and the RAF was operating from bases in southern England which made communication more difficult. The French denied the use of the Dunkirk, Bourbourg and Gravelines bases to the Belgians, which had initially been placed at its disposal. The Belgians were forced to use the only harbours left to them, at Nieuwpoort and Ostend.

Churchill and Maxime Weygand, who had taken over command from Gamelin, were still determined to break the German line and extricate their forces to the south. When they communicated their intentions to King Leopold and van Overstraten on 24 May, the latter was stunned. A dangerous gap was starting to open between the British and Belgians between Ypres and Menen, which threatened what remained of the Belgian front. The Belgians could not cover it; such a move would have overstretched them. Without consulting the French or asking permission from his government, Gort immediately and decisively ordered the British 5th and 50th infantry divisions to plug the gap and abandon any offensive operations further south.

On the afternoon of 24 May, Bock had thrown four divisions, of Reichenau's 6th Army, against the Belgian IV Corps position at the Kortrijk area of the Leie during the Battle of the Lys (1940). The Germans managed, against fierce resistance, to cross the river at night and force a one-mile penetration along a 13-mile front between Wervik and Kortrijk. The Germans, with superior numbers and in command of the air, had won the bridgehead. Nevertheless, the Belgians had inflicted many casualties and several tactical defeats on the Germans. The 1st, 3rd, 9th and 10th infantry divisions, acting as reinforcements, had counterattacked several times and managed to capture 200 German prisoners. Belgian artillery and infantry were then heavily attacked by the Luftwaffe, which forced their defeat. The Belgians blamed the French and British for not providing air cover. The German bridgehead dangerously exposed the eastern flank of the southward stretched BEF's 4th Infantry Division. Montgomery dispatched several units of the 3rd Infantry Division (including the heavy infantry of the 1st and 7th Middlesex battalions and the 99th Battery, 20th Anti-tank Regiment), as an improvised defence.

A critical point of the "Weygand Plan" and the British government and French Army's argument for a thrust south, was the withdrawal of forces to see the offensive through which had left the Belgian Army over-extended and was instrumental in its collapse. It was forced to cover the areas held by the BEF in order to enable the latter to engage in the offensive. Such a collapse could have resulted in the loss of the Channel ports behind the Allied front, leading to a complete strategic encirclement. The BEF could have done more to counterattack Bock's left flank to relieve the Belgians as Bock attacked across the fortified British position at Kortrijk. The Belgian High Command made at least five appeals for the British to attack the vulnerable left flank of the German divisions between the Scheldt and the Leie to avert disaster.

Admiral Sir Roger Keyes transmitted the following message to GHQ:

Van Overstraten is desperately keen for strong British counterattack. Either north or south of Leie could help restore the situation. Belgians expect to be attacked on the Ghent front tomorrow. Germans already have a bridgehead over canal west of Eecloo. There can be no question of the Belgian withdrawal to Yser. One battalion on march NE of Ypres was practically wiped out today in attack by sixty aircraft. Withdrawal over open roads without adequate fighter support very costly. Whole of their supplies are east of Yser. They strongly represent attempt should be made to restore the situation on Leie by British counter-attack for which opportunity may last another few hours only.

No such attack came. The Germans brought fresh reserves to cover the gap (Menen–Ypres). This nearly cut the Belgians off from the British. The 2nd, 6th and 10th cavalry divisions frustrated German attempts to exploit the gap in depth but the situation was still critical. On 26 May, Operation Dynamo officially commenced, in which large French and British contingents were to be evacuated to the United Kingdom. By that time, the Royal Navy had already withdrawn 28,000 British non-fighting troops. Boulogne had fallen and Calais was about to, leaving Dunkirk, Ostend and Zeebrugge as the only viable ports which could be used for evacuation. The advance of the 14th German Army would not leave Ostend available for much longer. To the west, the German Army Group A had reached Dunkirk and were 4 miles (6.4 km) from its centre on the morning of 27 May, bringing the port within artillery range.

The situation on 27 May had changed considerably from just 24 hours earlier. The Belgian Army had been forced from the Leie line on 26 May, and Nevele, Vynckt, Tielt and Izegem had fallen on the western and central part of the Leie front. In the east, the Germans had reached the outskirts of Bruges, and captured Ursel. In the west, the Menen–Ypres line had broken at Kortrijk and the Belgians were now using railway trucks to help form anti-tank defences on a line from Ypres–Passchendaele–Roulers. Further to the west the BEF had been forced back, north of Lille just over the French border and was now in danger of allowing a gap to develop between themselves and the Belgian southern flank on the Ypres–Lille axis. The danger in allowing a German advance to Dunkirk would mean the loss of the port which was now too great. The British withdrew to the port on 26 May. In doing so, they left the French 1st Army's north-eastern flank near Lille exposed. As the British moved out, the Germans moved in, encircling the bulk of the French Army. Both Gort and his chief of staff, General Henry Pownall, accepted that their withdrawal would mean the destruction of the French 1st Army, and they would be blamed for it.

The fighting of 26–27 May had brought the Belgian Army to the brink of collapse. The Belgians still held the Ypres–Roulers line to the west, and the Bruges–Thelt line to the east. However, on 27 May, the central front collapsed in the Izegem–Thelt sector. There was now nothing to prevent a German thrust to the east to take Ostend and Bruges, or west to take the ports at Nieuwpoort or La Panne, deep in the Allied rear. The Belgians had practically exhausted all available means of resistance. The disintegration of the Belgian Army and its front caused many erroneous accusations by the British. In fact, on numerous occasions, the Belgians had held on after British withdrawals. One example was the taking over of the Scheldt line, where they relieved the British 44th Infantry Division, allowing it to retire through their ranks. Despite this, Gort and to a greater extent Pownall, showed anger at the Belgian king's decision to surrender on 28 May, considering it to undercut the war effort. . When it was inquired if any Belgians were to be evacuated, Pownall was reported to have replied, "We don't care a bugger what happens to the Belgians".

=== Belgian surrender ===
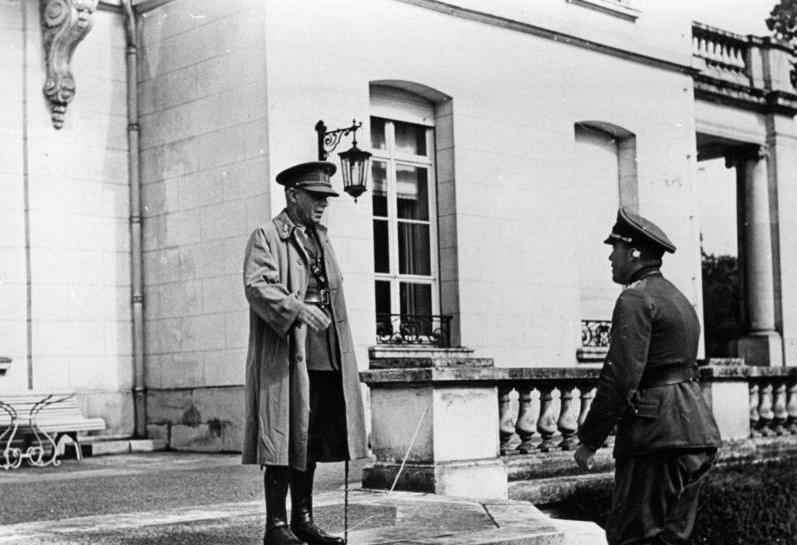
Negotiating the Belgian capitulation

The Belgian Army was stretched from Cadzand south to Menen on the river Leie, and west, from Menin, to Bruges without any sort of reserves. With the exception of a few RAF sorties, the air was exclusively under the control of the Luftwaffe, and the Belgians reported attacks against all targets considered an objective, with resulting casualties. No natural obstacles remained between the Belgians and the German Army; retreat was not feasible. The Luftwaffe had destroyed most of the rail networks to Dunkirk, just three roads were left: Bruges–Torhout–Diksmuide, Bruges–Gistel–Nieupoort and Bruges–Ostend–Nieuwpoort. Using such axes of retreat was impossible without losses owing to German air supremacy (as opposed to air superiority). Water supplies were damaged and cut off, gas and electricity supplies were also cut. Canals were drained and used as supply dumps for whatever ammunition and food-stuffs were left. The total remaining area covered just 1,700 km^{2}, and compacted military and civilians alike, of which the latter numbered some 3 million people. Under these circumstances Leopold deemed further resistance useless. On the evening of 27 May, he requested an armistice.

Churchill sent a message to Keyes the same day, and made clear what he thought of the request:

Belgian Embassy here assumes from King's decision to remain that he regards the war as lost and contemplates [a] separate peace. It is in order to dissociate itself from this that the constitutional Belgian Government has reassembled on foreign soil. Even if present Belgian Army has to lay down its arms, there are 200,000 Belgians of military age in France, and greater resources than Belgium had in 1914 which to fight back. By present decision the King is dividing the Nation and delivering it into Hitler's protection. Please convey these considerations to the King, and impress upon him the disastrous consequences to the Allies and to Belgium of his present choice.

The Royal Navy evacuated General Headquarters at Middelkerke and Sint-Andries, east of Bruges, during the night. Leopold III, and his mother Queen Mother Elisabeth, stayed in Belgium to endure five years of self-imposed captivity. In response to the advice of his government to set up a government-in-exile Leopold said, "I have decided to stay. The cause of the Allies is lost." The Belgian surrender came into effect at 04:00 on 28 May. Recriminations abounded with the British and French claiming the Belgians had betrayed the alliance. In Paris, the French Premier Paul Reynaud denounced Leopold's surrender, and the Belgian Premier Hubert Pierlot informed the people that Leopold had taken action against the unanimous advice of the government. As a result, the king was no longer in a position to govern and the Belgian government in exile that was located in Paris (later moved to London following the fall of France) would continue the struggle. The chief complaint was that the Belgians had not given any prior warning that their situation was so serious as to capitulate. Such claims were largely unjust. The Allies had known, and admitted it privately on 25 May through contact with the Belgians, that the latter were on the verge of collapse.

Churchill's and the British response was officially restrained. This was due to the strong-willed defence of the Belgian defensive campaign presented to the cabinet by Sir Roger Keyes at 11:30 am 28 May. The French and Belgian ministers had referred to Leopold's actions as treasonous, but they were unaware of the true events: Leopold had not signed an agreement with Hitler in order to form a collaborative government, but an unconditional surrender as Commander-in-Chief of the Belgian Armed Forces.

== Casualties ==
The casualty reports include total losses at this point in the campaign. The figures for the Battle of Belgium, 10–28 May 1940, cannot be known with any certainty.

=== Belgian ===
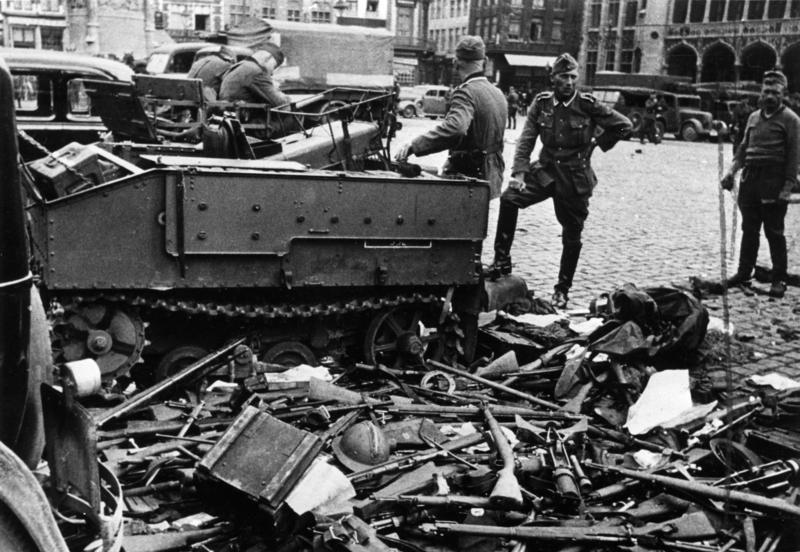
German soldiers pile up Belgian weapons in Bruges after the surrender.

Belgian casualties stood at:

- Killed in action: 6,093 and 2,000 Belgian prisoners died in captivity
- Missing: more than 500
- Captured: 200,000
- Wounded: 15,850
- Aircraft: 112 destroyed

=== French ===
Numbers for the Battle of Belgium are unknown, but the French suffered the following losses throughout the entire western campaign, 10 May – 22 June:

- Killed in action: 90,000
- Wounded: 200,000
- Prisoners of War: 1,900,000.
- Total French losses in aircraft numbered 264 from 12 to 25 May, and 50 for 26 May to 1 June.

=== British ===
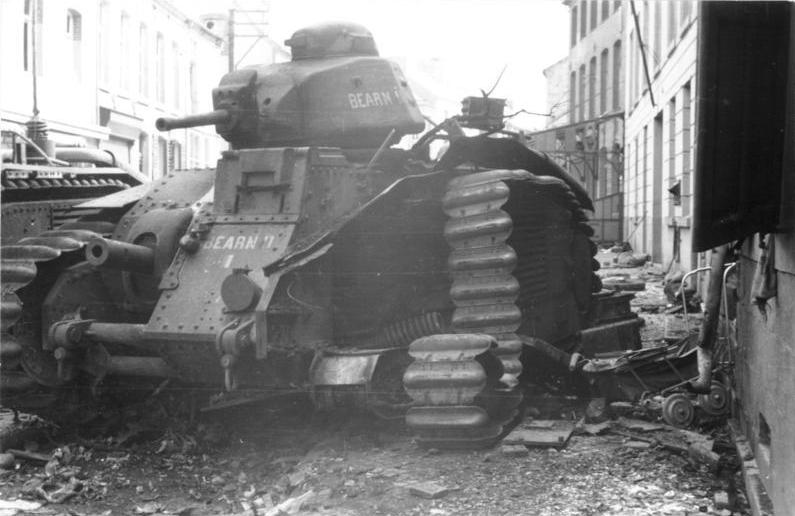
A destroyed French heavy Char B1 in Beaumont

Numbers for the Battle of Belgium are unknown, but the British suffered the following losses throughout the entire campaign, 10 May – 22 June:

- 68,111 killed in action, wounded or captured.
- 64,000 vehicles destroyed or abandoned
- 2,472 guns destroyed or abandoned
- RAF losses throughout the entire campaign (10 May – 22 June) amounted to 931 aircraft and 1,526 casualties. Casualties to 28 May are unknown. Total British losses in the air numbered 344 between 12 and 25 May, and 138 between 26 May and 1 June.

=== German ===
The consolidated report of the Oberkommando der Wehrmacht regarding the operations in the west from 10 May to 4 June (German: Zusammenfassender Bericht des Oberkommandos der Wehrmacht über die Operationen im Westen vom 10. Mai bis 4. Juni) reports:

- Killed in action: 10,232 officers and soldiers
- Missing: 8,463 officers and soldiers
- Wounded: 42,523 officers and soldiers
- Losses of the Luftwaffe from 10 May to 3 June: 432 aircraft
- Losses of the Kriegsmarine: none

== Official UK historiography ==
On 25 November 1946, the Government announced to the House of Commons its decision to publish a military series of the UK history of the Second World War. In 1954, the book The War in France and Flanders 1939–1940 was published. Its full text is online.

== See also ==
- German invasion of Luxembourg
- Mechelen incident
- List of Belgian military equipment of World War II
- List of French military equipment of World War II
- List of British military equipment of World War II
- List of German military equipment of World War II
- German invasion of Belgium (1914)
