= Walter Koch (paratrooper) =

Fallschirmjäger of World War II

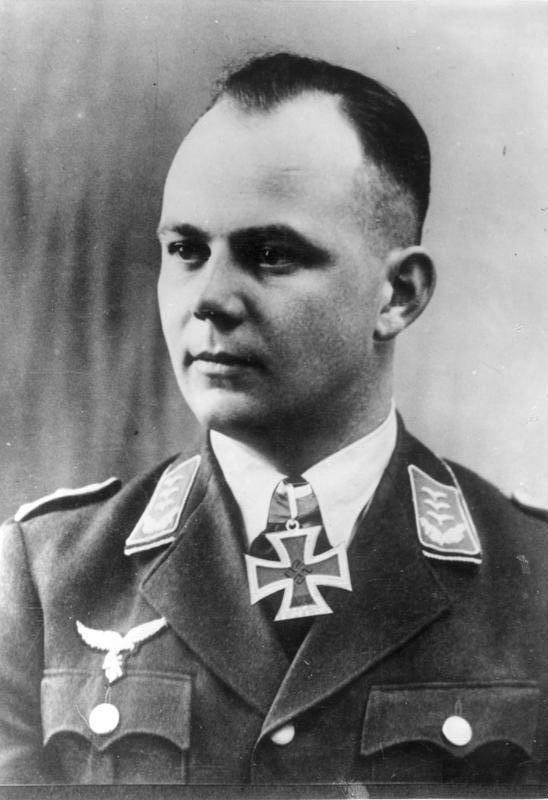
- Koch in 1941; Note that the Knight's Cross at his neck is a photomontage
- Born: 10 September 1910; Bonn, Rhine Province, Kingdom of Prussia, German Empire
- Died: 23 October 1943 (aged 33); Berlin, Free State of Prussia, Nazi Germany
- Military career
- Allegiance: Nazi Germany
- Branch: Luftwaffe
- Service years: 1929–1935 (Police); 1935–1943 (Luftwaffe)
- Rank: Oberstleutnant
- Unit: 1. Fallschirmjäger-Division
- Commands: Sturmabteilung Koch
- Conflicts: World War II: Battle of Fort Eben-Emael; Battle of Crete; Eastern Front; Battle of Tunisia
- Awards: Knight's Cross of the Iron Cross
- Other work: Police officer

Walter Koch (10 September 1910 – 23 October 1943) was a commander of the Fallschirmjäger during World War II who died in mysterious circumstances after openly criticising Adolf Hitler. Koch, who was the recipient of the Knight's Cross of the Iron Cross for his actions during the Battle of Fort Eben-Emael in May 1940, had publicly denounced the Führer's infamous Commando Order, which ordered that all captured enemy commandos were to be executed. Shortly afterwards the Oberstleutnant and commander of Fallschirmjäger-Regiment 5 died in Berlin from injuries allegedly resulting from a motor vehicle collision.

== Early career ==
Walter Koch joined the Landespolizei as an officer on 3 April 1929. As a Leutnant he had served in the state police and a police battalion for special purposes (Polizeiabteilung z.b.V. Wecke). In 1935 the new commander-in-chief of the Luftwaffe, Hermann Göring, transferred this police unit into the reformed Luftwaffe and renamed it the Regiment "General Göring".

== Airborne service ==
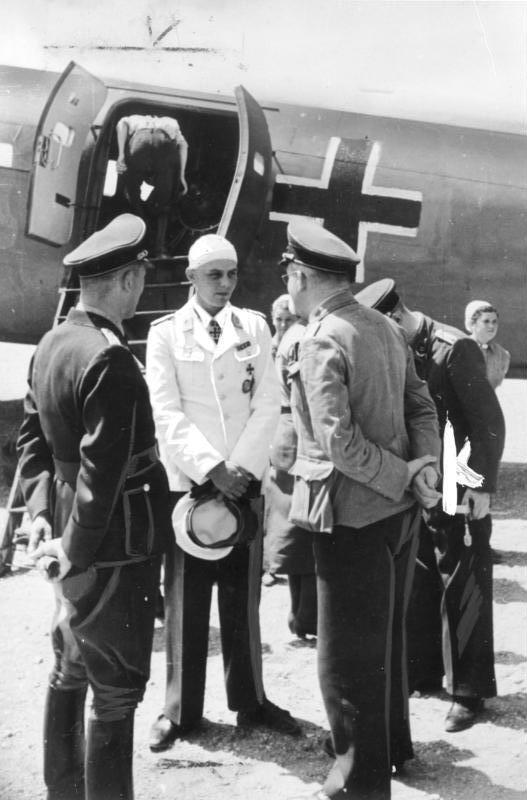
A wounded Koch returning to Germany in June 1941 following the Battle of Crete.

Koch was promoted to Hauptmann (Captain) on 20 April 1938. He was then tasked with training a special commando unit dubbed Koch Parachute Assault Battalion (Fallschirmjäger-Sturm-Abteilung "Koch") for operations in the west.

When Fall Gelb began in May 1940, his troops saw action during the opening phase of the Battle of France during assaults on the Belgian fortress Eben-Emael, the Maas river and Albert Canal bridges. Koch's commandos successfully captured Fort Eben-Emael and the bridges in Veldwezelt and Vroenhoeven. Only the bridge at Kanne, which was blown up by the Belgian defenders, was not taken by the German paratroopers. For these successful operations, Walter Koch along with ten other Wehrmacht officers received the Knight's Cross of the Iron Cross.

By May 1941, Koch was promoted to Major and given the command of the re-designated I Battalion, 1st Parachute Assault Regiment (I./Luftlande-Sturm-Regiment 1) The battalion was part of the first attacking airborne waves during the Battle of Crete. Koch led the attack using 53 DFS 230 troop-carrying gliders. Their target was the village of Maleme on the western coast of Crete because its small coastal airfield, commanded by Hill 107, and the nearby Soudha bay, both close to the island's capital Chania, were ideal support bases due to the closeness to mainland Greece. The German troops faced the New Zealanders of 5 Brigade's 22nd Battalion, with other battalions close behind, under the command of Brigadier Edward Puttick. Although Koch was wounded in the head in the battle for Hill 107 on the first day, his airborne troops quickly achieved their targets.

Koch was promoted to Oberstleutnant (Lieutenant Colonel) on 20 April 1942. He and the 5th Parachute Regiment (Fallschirmjäger-Regiment 5) were transferred to Tunisia in mid November 1942.

== Death ==
Shortly after stopping the killing of POWs in North Africa, Koch was wounded in the head. The highly experienced combat leader was sent back to Germany to recover from his wounds; while there he was placed in the Führerreserve. While convalescing he was involved in a car accident. He died in a Berlin Hospital from these injuries in October 1943. However many in his regiment believed that this was no accident and he had been most likely killed by the SS-Reichssicherheitshauptamt because of his outspoken criticism of the Commando Order.

== Awards ==
- Iron Cross (1939)
  - 2nd Class (12 May 1940)
  - 1st Class (12 May 1940)
- Knight's Cross of the Iron Cross on 10 May 1940 as Hauptmann and commander of Fallschirmjäger-Sturm-Abteilung "Koch" (Note: According to Scherzer as commander of Luftlande-Sturm-Abteilung "Koch".)
- German Cross in Gold on 31 March 1942 as Major in the I./Luftlande-Sturm-Abteilung

== Notes ==
Military offices
Preceded by none	Commander of Luftlande-Sturm-Regiment 1; 2 November 1939 – 31 August 1940	Succeeded by Generalmajor Eugen Meindl
