= Eugen Meindl =

WW2 German general (1892-1951)

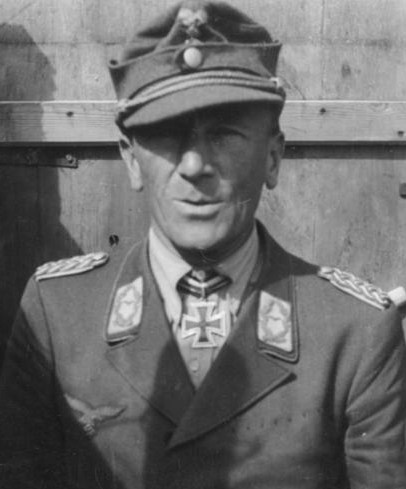
- Born: 16 July 1892; Donaueschingen, Grand Duchy of Baden, German Empire
- Died: 24 January 1951 (aged 58); Munich, West Germany
- Children: Wilhelm Meindl
- Military career
- Allegiance: German Empire; Weimar Republic; Nazi Germany
- Branch: Luftwaffe
- Service years: 1912–1945
- Rank: General der Fallschirmtruppe
- Commands: 2nd Parachute Corps
- Conflicts: World War I; World War II; Norwegian Campaign; Battle of Crete; Eastern Front; Battle of Normandy; Battle of Nijmegen
- Awards: Knight's Cross of the Iron Cross with Oak Leaves

Eugen Meindl (16 July 1892 – 24 January 1951) was a German paratroop general in the Luftwaffe during World War II. He was a recipient of the Knight's Cross of the Iron Cross with Oak Leaves.

== Life and career ==
Born in 1892, Eugen Meindl enlisted in the army in 1912 and served during World War I. Meindl served with various artillery units in the Reichswehr, the post-war armed forces of the Weimar Republic, and subsequently in the Wehrmacht (Armed Forces after Weimar). In November 1938, Meindl was named commander of the 112th Mountain Artillery Regiment in Graz. Promoted to Oberst, he led the "Meindl Group" and made his very first parachute jump at Narvik. He transferred to the Luftwaffe in November 1940.

During the airborne invasion of Crete, Meindl jumped near the Platanias Bridge, where he was shot in the chest and seriously wounded. In February 1942, Meindl, now a Generalmajor, became commander of the newly formed Luftwaffe Division 'Meindl' in the Soviet Union. In September he took over the 13th Air Corps (later I Luftwaffe Field Corps).

In 1943, he was promoted to commanding general of the 2nd Parachute Corps, which he led in the west on the invasion front and later at Cleves and in the Klever Reichswald. His unit participated in the Battle of Nijmegen during Operation Market Garden (September 1944), but was halted on the Groesbeek Heights by dug-in American paratroopers, and thus unable to stop the Allies from taking the city and the strategically important bridges across the river Waal. Meindl's corps fought at Goch and in the Wesel bridgehead, where he was made commander on 5 March 1945. Meindl immediately advised High Command that the bridgehead ought to be evacuated but was unable to secure Hitler's agreement to this until the evening of 9 March. In the intervening four days Meindl had already organized the evacuation of the bridgehead and was therefore able to bring away the remains of seven divisions and two panzer units with most of their equipment; in his words, "all that would float came back again". Meindl continued to command the 2nd Parachute Corps until its eventual surrender at Grossbrekendorf near Schleswig in early May. He died in 1951.

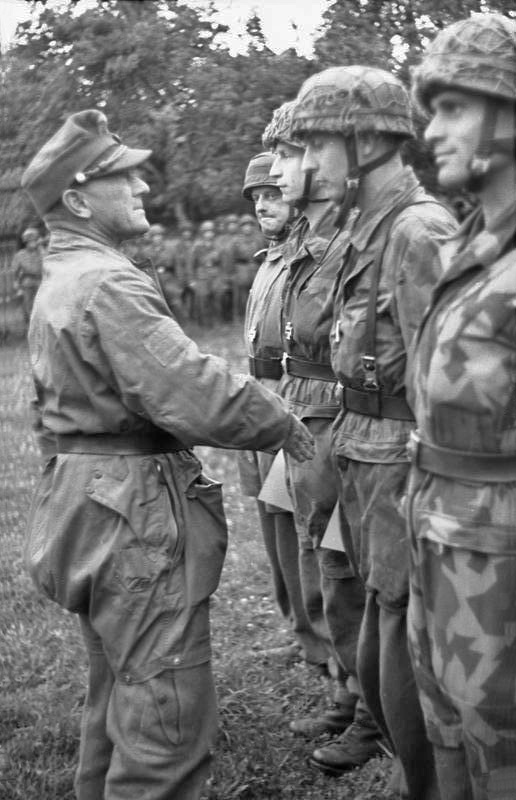
Eugen Meindl at medal ceremony with paratroopers on June 21, 1944

== Awards ==
- Iron Cross (1914) 1st Class (17 January 1916) and 2nd Class (18 July 1915)
- Clasp to the Iron Cross (1939) 1st Class (10 June 1940) and 2nd Class (22 October 1939)
- Narvik Shield (10 November 1940)
- Wound Badge (1939) in Black (25 October 1941)
- Eastern Front Medal (9 August 1942)
- German Cross in Gold on 27 July 1942 as Generalmajor in the Luftwaffen-Division "Meindl"
- Knight's Cross of the Iron Cross with Oak Leaves and Swords
  - Knight's Cross on 14 June 1941 as Generalmajor and commander Fallschirmjäger-Sturm-Regiment
  - 564th Oak Leaves on 31 August 1944 as General der Fallschirmtruppe and commanding general of the II. Fallschirmkorps

== Nomination for Swords to Knight's Cross ==
In April 1945, Meindl was nominated for Swords to the Knight's Cross; the nomination by the troop was approved by each of his commanding officers. However, the nomination contains no final remark on the proceedings. Oberst Nicolaus von Below, Hitler's Luftwaffe adjutant, had sent a teleprinter message to the commanding general of the Fallschirmarmee Generaloberst Kurt Student, requesting a statement for this nomination. The copy of the teleprinter contains a note: resubmission "23 April 1945". It seems that the statement was never returned. The paperwork was not finalized by the end of the war. The Association of Knight's Cross Recipients (AKCR) claims that the award was presented in accordance with the Dönitz-decree. According to the Deutsche Dienststelle (WASt), this process lacks legal justification. Fellgiebel assigned the presentation date.

Meindl is mentioned on a list of the Oberbefehlshaber Nordwest for "Nominations and Bestowal of War Awards" from May 1945. This list, which was intended to be presented to Karl Dönitz, contained twelve names of pending nominations which had been submitted via the chain of command. Dönitz never signed the paper. The responsible personnel offices awarded or declined eight nominations from this list by the end of the war, two remained unprocessed by the Heerespersonalamt ('HPA—Army Personnel Office') and Luftwaffenpersonalamt ('LPA — Luftwaffe Personnel Office') and two further were left ready for signing at the Oberkommando der Wehrmacht/Wehrmacht-Führungsstab ('OKW/WFSt—leadership staff of the Army High Command').

Military offices
Preceded by Oberst Walter Koch	Commander of Luftlande-Sturm-Regiment 1; 1 September 1940 – 21 May 1941	Succeeded by Oberst Hermann-Bernhard Ramcke
Preceded by Oberst Hermann-Bernhard Ramcke	Commander of Luftlande-Sturm-Regiment 1; 19 June 1941 – 26 February 1942	Succeeded by Luftwaffen-Division Meindl
