= Luftlande-Sturm-Regiment =

Luftlande-Sturm-Regiment 1 (1st Airborne Assault Regiment)
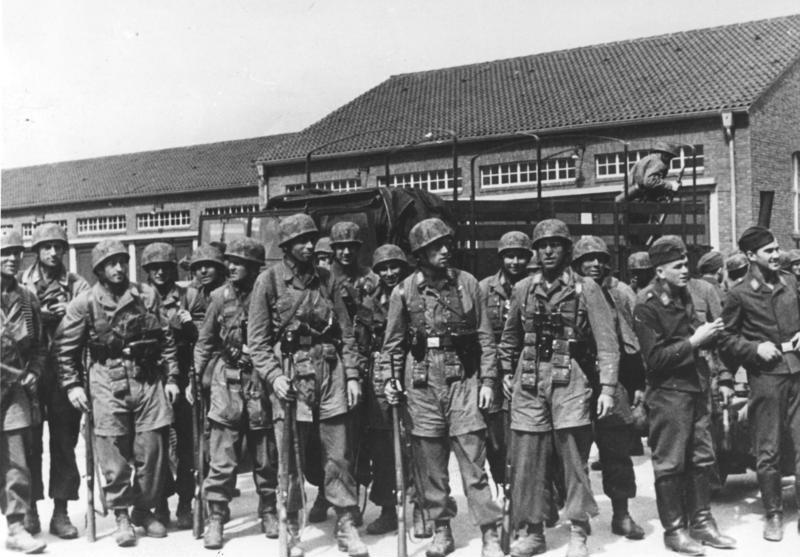
- German paratroopers at Fort Eben-Emael, Belgium in 1940
- Active: 1939–1942
- Country: Nazi Germany
- Branch: Luftwaffe
- Type: Fallschirmjäger
- Role: Airborne force
- Engagements: World War II: Battle of Fort Eben-Emael; Battle of Crete; Russian Front

Luftlande-Sturm-Regiment 1 (also known as Sturmabteilung Koch) was a German Fallschirmjäger regiment in the Luftwaffe which captured the Belgian Fort Eben-Emael during the Battle of Belgium, took part in the Battle of Crete, and fought on the Eastern Front during World War II.

== Operational history ==
The Battalion was formed in November 1939; it was named after its commander, Captain Walter Koch, as Assault Battalion Koch. It was intended to open the way into central Belgium by capturing the formidable Fort Eben-Emael defending the Albert Canal as well three bridges over the canal. The DFS 230 gliders were to be used to allow the assault groups to silently land virtually on top of their objectives, surprising the defenders and preventing them from destroying the bridge. The airborne assault took place on 10 May 1940. The Belgian defenders were unable to muster any serious counterattacks against the paratroops.

Two more battalions were formed during the fall of 1940 and the unit was redesignated as the 1st Air Landing Assault Regiment (German: Luftlande-Sturm-Regiment 1). A fourth battalion was raised during the winter of 1940/41. The regiment did not participate in the opening stages of the invasions of Greece and Yugoslavia, but was kept in reserve until it was needed for the invasion of Crete. The 1st battalion was landed by DFS 230 gliders towed by Ju 52s of Luftlandegeschwader 1, but the rest of the regiment was parachuted in the vicinity of Maleme airfield on 20 May 1941. They landed almost on top of the New Zealand 5th Infantry Brigade, part of the 2nd New Zealand Infantry Division and suffered severely at their hands. However, reinforced by several battalions of the 5th Gebirgs (Mountain) Division that landed the next day they were able to force the New Zealanders to retreat. This was the only time in the war that the regiment fought as a complete unit. Following the surrender of Crete, regiment forces were involved in murdering civilians in villages such as Kondomari, Alikianos and Kandanos.

After reforming and refitting, the regiment took part in the fighting in the Soviet Union prior to and during the Soviet winter counter-offensive. The 2nd Battalion was deployed in the Army Group North sector. The 4th Battalion arrived to the Soviet Union in November to shore up German defenses near Stalino. The 1st Battalion was flown to Smolensk on 6 December 1941 and then moved to the Yukhnov area, west of Kaluga, to bolster the German defenses there. It was transferred to France in May 1942. The regimental staff accompanied the 1st Battalion to the Soviet Union, but was used to control many of the Luftwaffe units forced into a ground-combat role by the Soviet winter counter-offensive. It was redesignated as Stab Luftwaffe-Division Meindl in February 1942. Elements of the regiment also took part in the fighting in the Rzhev area starting on 3 January 1942, to reinforce defenses of the 9th Army. This unit was transferred to France on 10 April 1942

== Commanders ==
- Walter Koch, 2 November 1939 – 31 August 1940
- Eugen Meindl, 1 September 1940 – 21 May 1941
- Hermann-Bernhard Ramcke, 21 May-18 June 1941
- Eugen Meindl, 19 June 1941 – 26 February 1942
