= Oud-Vroenhoven =

Coordinates: 50°50′N 5°39′E

Oud-Vroenhoven is former municipality in the Dutch province of Limburg. It merged with Maastricht in 1920.

The municipality covered a large part of the current municipality of Maastricht west of the river Meuse outside the walls of the city. In 1918, Kaiser Wilhelm II crossed into the Netherlands at the border crossing at Oud-Vroenhoven.
