= List of Knight's Cross of the Iron Cross recipients (Sa–Schr) =

The Knight's Cross of the Iron Cross (German: Ritterkreuz des Eisernen Kreuzes) and its variants were the highest awards in the military and paramilitary forces of Nazi Germany during World War II. The Knight's Cross of the Iron Cross was awarded for a wide range of reasons and across all ranks, from a senior commander for skilled leadership of his troops in battle to a low-ranking soldier for a single act of extreme gallantry. A total of 7,321 awards were made between its first presentation on 30 September 1939 and its last bestowal on 17 June 1945. (Note: Großadmiral and President of Germany Karl Dönitz, Hitler's successor as Head of State (Staatsoberhaupt) and Supreme Commander of the Armed Forces, had ordered the cessation of all promotions and awards as of 11 May 1945 (Dönitz-decree). Consequently the last Knight's Cross awarded to Oberleutnant zur See of the Reserves Georg-Wolfgang Feller on 17 June 1945 must therefore be considered a de facto but not de jure hand-out.) This number is based on the analysis and acceptance of the order commission of the Association of Knight's Cross Recipients (AKCR). Presentations were made to members of the three military branches of the Wehrmacht—the Heer (Army), Kriegsmarine (Navy) and Luftwaffe (Air Force)—as well as the Waffen-SS, the Reichsarbeitsdienst (RAD—Reich Labour Service) and the Volkssturm (German national militia). There were also 43 recipients in the military forces of allies of the Third Reich.

These recipients are listed in the 1986 edition of Walther-Peer Fellgiebel's book, Die Träger des Ritterkreuzes des Eisernen Kreuzes 1939–1945 [The Bearers of the Knight's Cross of the Iron Cross 1939–1945]. Fellgiebel was the former chairman and head of the order commission of the AKCR. In 1996, the second edition of this book was published with an addendum delisting 11 of these original recipients. Author Veit Scherzer has cast doubt on a further 193 of these listings. The majority of the disputed recipients had been nominated for the award in 1945, when the deteriorating situation of Germany during the final days of World War II left a number of nominations incomplete and pending in various stages of the approval process.

Listed here are the 457 recipients whose last name is in the range "Sa–Schr". Scherzer has challenged the validity of 11 of these listings. This is the first of two lists of all 1,060 Knight's Cross of the Iron Cross recipients whose last names start with "S". The recipients whose last name is in the range "Schu–Sz" are listed at List of Knight's Cross of the Iron Cross recipients (Schu–Sz). The recipients are ordered alphabetically by last name. The rank listed is the recipient's rank at the time the Knight's Cross was awarded.

== Background ==
The Knight's Cross of the Iron Cross and its higher grades were based on four separate enactments. The first enactment, Reichsgesetzblatt I S. 1573 of 1 September 1939 instituted the Iron Cross (Eisernes Kreuz), the Knight's Cross of the Iron Cross and the Grand Cross of the Iron Cross (Großkreuz des Eisernen Kreuzes). Article 2 of the enactment mandated that the award of a higher class be preceded by the award of all preceding classes. As the war progressed, some of the recipients of the Knight's Cross distinguished themselves further and a higher grade, the Knight's Cross of the Iron Cross with Oak Leaves (Ritterkreuz des Eisernen Kreuzes mit Eichenlaub), was instituted. The Oak Leaves, as they were commonly referred to, were based on the enactment Reichsgesetzblatt I S. 849 of 3 June 1940. In 1941, two higher grades of the Knight's Cross were instituted. The enactment Reichsgesetzblatt I S. 613 of 28 September 1941 introduced the Knight's Cross of the Iron Cross with Oak Leaves and Swords (Ritterkreuz des Eisernen Kreuzes mit Eichenlaub und Schwertern) and the Knight's Cross of the Iron Cross with Oak Leaves, Swords and Diamonds (Ritterkreuz des Eisernen Kreuzes mit Eichenlaub, Schwertern und Brillanten). At the end of 1944 the final grade, the Knight's Cross of the Iron Cross with Golden Oak Leaves, Swords, and Diamonds (Ritterkreuz des Eisernen Kreuzes mit goldenem Eichenlaub, Schwertern und Brillanten), based on the enactment Reichsgesetzblatt 1945 I S. 11 of 29 December 1944, became the final variant of the Knight's Cross authorized.

== Recipients ==
Knight's Cross of the Iron Cross (Sa–Schr)
Service	Number of presentations	Posthumous presentations
Heer	294	23
Kriegsmarine	23	0
Luftwaffe	109	3
Waffen-SS	31	2

The Oberkommando der Wehrmacht (Supreme Command of the Armed Forces) kept separate Knight's Cross lists, one for each of the three military branches, Heer (Army), Kriegsmarine (Navy), Luftwaffe (Air Force) and for the Waffen-SS. Within each of these lists a unique sequential number was assigned to each recipient. The same numbering paradigm was applied to the higher grades of the Knight's Cross, one list per grade. Of the 457 awards made to servicemen whose last name is in the range "Sa–Schr", 47 were later awarded the Knight's Cross of the Iron Cross with Oak Leaves, four the Knight's Cross of the Iron Cross with Oak Leaves and Swords and three the Knight's Cross of the Iron Cross with Oak Leaves, Swords and Diamonds; 28 presentations were made posthumously. Heer members, including the Volkssturm, received 294 of the medals; 23 went to the Kriegsmarine, 109 to the Luftwaffe, and 31 to the Waffen-SS and Allgemeine SS. The sequential numbers greater than 843 for the Knight's Cross of the Iron Cross with Oak Leaves are unofficial and were assigned by the Association of Knight's Cross Recipients (AKCR) and are therefore denoted in parentheses.

This along with the + (plus) indicates that a higher grade of Knight's Cross was awarded as well.
This along with the * (asterisk) indicates that the Knight's Cross was awarded posthumously.
This along with the ? (question mark) indicates that author Veit Scherzer has expressed doubt regarding the veracity and formal correctness of the listing.

Name	Service	Rank	Role and unit (Note: For an explanation of the various naming schemes used by the Luftwaffe, Heer, Kriegsmarine and Waffen-SS refer to nomenclature used by the Wehrmacht and Waffen-SS.)	Date of award	Notes	Image
Rudolf Saalbach	Waffen-SS	SS-Hauptsturmführer	Commander of SS-Panzer-Aufklärungs-Abteilung 11 "Nordland" (Note: According to Scherzer as commander of SS-Panzer-Aufklärungs-Abteilung 11.)	12 March 1944	—	—
Alfred Saalwächter	Kriegsmarine	General Admiral	Marine-Gruppenbefehlshaber Marinegruppe West (Note: According to Scherzer as commander of Marinegruppenkommando West.)	9 May 1940	—	—
Wilhelm Sabottki	Heer	Stabsfeldwebel	Zugführer (platoon leader) in the 4./Grenadier-Regiment 1	20 March 1944	—	—
Friedrich Sacha	Heer	Oberleutnant	Chief of the 2./Panzer-Jäger-Abteilung 160	20 January 1943	—	—
Hans-Hermann Sachenbacher	Heer	Rittmeister	Chief of Radfahr-Schwadron 219	14 December 1941	—	—
Otto Sacher	Heer	Oberstleutnant	Commander of Grenadier-Regiment 456	6 February 1944	—	—
Günther Sachs	Luftwaffe	Generalmajor	Commander of the 18. Flak-Division	24 January 1945	—	—
Hans Sachs	Heer	Obergefreiter	Group leader in the 5./Panzer-Füsilier-Regiment "Großdeutschland"	10 September 1944	—	—
Heinz Sachsenberg	Luftwaffe	Fahnenjunker-Feldwebel	Pilot in the 6./Jagdgeschwader 52	9 September 1944	—	—
Max Sachsenheimer+	Heer	Hauptmann	Commander of the II./Jäger-Regiment 75	5 April 1942	Awarded 472nd Oak Leaves 14 May 1944; 132nd Swords 6 February 1945	—
Emil Sack	Heer	Oberfeldwebel	Zugführer (platoon leader) in the 4.(MG)/Infanterie-Regiment 445 (Note: According to Scherzer as Zugführer (platoon leader) in the 4./Infanterie-Regiment 445.)	29 September 1941	—	—
Friedrich Saenger	Heer	Oberleutnant (Note: According to Scherzer as Oberleutnant des Beurlaubtenstandes (of the reserve status).)	Chief of the 10./Artillerie-Regiment 1352	28 February 1945	—	—
Rudolf Säumenicht	Waffen-SS	SS-Hauptsturmführer	Chief of the 2./SS-Panzer-Regiment 3 "Totenkopf" (Note: According to Scherzer as chief of the 2./SS-Panzer-Regiment 3.)	13 October 1943	—	—
Günther Sahner	Heer	Unteroffizier	Vorgeschobener Beobachter (forward observer) in the 3./Grenadier-Regiment 176 (Note: According to Scherzer as grenade-thrower Vorgeschobener Beobachter (forward observer) in the 3./Grenadier-Regiment 176.)	5 March 1945*	Killed in action 6 February 1945 (Note: According to Scherzer, missing in action in March 1945.)	—
Johann Sailer? (Note: No evidence of the award to Johann Sailer can be found in the German Federal Archives. According to Walther-Peer Fellgiebel it was presumably awarded by SS-Oberstgruppenführer Sepp Dietrich, which would make it an unlawful presentation. The sources for this assumption are H. Buch and W. Kment. According to Buch—note from 25 June 2005—he had nothing to do with this presentation. According to Scherzer, Kment cannot be the source, since Buch stated that Kment died in the early 1970s. If indeed Kment was the source then von Seemen would have listed Sailer in either the first or second edition of his book, which is not the case. Sailer himself states in his book "Kriegslebenslauf" (war diary) that he received the award on 4 May 1945. Fellgiebel dated the award on 6 May 1945. He may have done this to justify this as a Dietrich award. Ernst-Günther Krätschmer lists Sailer for the first time in the 3rd edition of his book without referencing a source. Sailer also claims to have received the German Cross in Gold on 19 March 1945, which also cannot be verified. Author Manfred Dörr was allowed access to Sailer's pay book and noticed that the Knight's Cross entry was formally incorrect. The entry thus does not appear to be authentic. Sailer was a member of the Association of Knight's Cross Recipients (AKCR).)	Waffen-SS	SS-Obersturmführer	Leader of the 3./SS-Panzer-Jäger-Abteilung 9 "Hohenstaufen"	6 May 1945	—	—
Dr. med. Friedrich Salamon	Heer	Stabsarzt of the Reserves (rank equivalent to Hauptmann)	Battalions doctor of the II./Panzergrenadier-Regiment 26 (Note: According to Scherzer as department doctor of the II./Panzergrenadier-Regiment 26.)	20 July 1944	—	—
Walter Salamon	Luftwaffe	Oberstleutnant	Commander of Flak-Sturm-Abteilung 802 (deployable) (Note: According to Scherzer as commander of gemischte Flak-Sturm-Abteilung 802 (deployable).)	18 November 1944	—	—
Sylvester von Saldern-Brallentin	Heer	Major	Commander of the II./Grenadier-Regiment 65	21 November 1943	—	—
Burghardt von Saldern-Wilsnack	Heer	Hauptmann	Commander of the II./Grenadier-Regiment 51 (motorized)	4 May 1944	—	—
Hans de Salengre-Drabbe	Heer	Oberst	Commander of Infanterie-Regiment 457	22 February 1942	—	—
Wilhelm von Salisch+	Heer	Hauptmann	Commander of the III./Jäger-Regiment 49	20 April 1943	Awarded 533rd Oak Leaves 27 July 1944	—
Karl-Walrad Prinz von Salm-Horstmar	Heer	Rittmeister	Commander of Aufklärungs-Abteilung 123	19 February 1942	—	—
Josef Salminger	Heer	Hauptmann	Commander of the III./Gebirgsjäger-Regiment 98	31 August 1941	—	—
Hans von Salmuth	Heer	Generalleutnant	Chief of the General Staff of Heeresgruppe B	19 July 1940	—	
Martin Saltzwedel	Kriegsmarine	Korvettenkapitän	Commander of destroyer Z24	15 June 1943	—	—
Benno Salwey	Heer	Oberleutnant of the Reserves	Aide-de-camp in the Stab Infanterie-Regiment 270	2 October 1941	—	—
Wilhelm Salz	Heer	Leutnant	Leader of the 6./Grenadier-Regiment 502	10 September 1944	—	—
Walter Salzmann	Heer	Oberleutnant	Leader of the 6./Infanterie-Regiment 121	27 June 1942	—	—
Kurt Sametreiter	Waffen-SS	SS-Oberscharführer	Zugführer (platoon leader) in the 3.(schwere)/SS-Panzer-Jäger-Abteilung 1 "Leibstandarte SS Adolf Hitler" (Note: According to Scherzer as Zugführer (platoon leader) in the 3./SS-Panzer-Jäger-Abteilung 1.)	31 July 1943	—	A man wearing a military uniform, peaked cap and a neck order in the shape of a cross. His cap has an emblem in shape of a human skull and crossed bones.
Ernst Sander	Heer	Oberfeldwebel	Zugführer (platoon leader) in the 7./Schützen-Regiment 79	13 October 1941	—	—
Erwin Sander	Heer	Generalmajor	Commander of the 170. Infanterie-Division	3 September 1942	—	—
Joachim Sander+	Heer	Oberstleutnant	Commander of Panzer-Regiment 23	19 September 1943	Awarded 729th Oak Leaves 5 February 1945	—
Walter Sander	Luftwaffe	Leutnant of the Reserves	Leader of the 1./Fallschirm-Pionier-Bataillon 5	28 February 1945	—	—
Wilhelm Sander	Heer	Fahnenjunker-Feldwebel	Zugführer (platoon leader) in the 1./Panzer-Jäger-Abteilung 370	23 December 1943	—	—
Bernhard Sanders	Heer	Unteroffizier	Group leader in the 7./Grenadier-Regiment 278	7 April 1944	—	—
Rudolf Sandig	Waffen-SS	SS-Sturmbannführer	Commander of the II./SS-Panzergrenadier-Regiment 2 "Leibstandarte SS Adolf Hitler" (Note: According to Scherzer as commander of the II./SS-Panzergrenadier-Regiment "Leibstandarte SS Adolf Hitler".)	5 May 1943	—	—
Karlheinz Sandmann	Heer	Unteroffizier	Group leader in the 1./Grenadier-Regiment 102	8 February 1944	—	—
Johann Sandner	Heer	Oberjäger	Group leader in the 11./Gebirgsjäger-Regiment 100	13 June 1941	—	—
Hans Sandrock	Luftwaffe	Major	Commander of the III./Fallschirm-Panzer-Regiment "Hermann Göring"	18 October 1944	—	—
Fritz Sann	Heer	Major	Leader of Marine-Infanterie-Regiment 8 (Note: According to Scherzer as leader of Infanterie-Regiment "Riedel"/Infanterie-Division Pommernland.)	14 April 1945	—	—
Werner Sanne	Heer	Generalmajor	Commander of the 100. leichte Jäger-Division	22 February 1942	—	—
Hermann Sardemann	Kriegsmarine	Oberleutnant (M.A.) of the Reserves	Chief of the battery "Lausitz" in the Marine-Flak-Abteilung 259 in Marine-Flak-Regiment 9 (Note: According to Scherzer as chief of the battery "Lausitz" in the Marine-Flak-Abteilung 259.)	20 April 1945	—	—
Bernhard Sartor	Luftwaffe	Oberleutnant	Observer in the Stab/Kampfgeschwader 51	20 July 1944	—	—
Eduard Freiherr von Saß	Heer	Oberstleutnant	Commander of Grenadier-Regiment 277	19 December 1942	—	—
[Dr.] Bruno Sassen (Note: The brackets around the doctor title [Dr.] denotes that the academic title was attained after the Knight's Cross of the Iron Cross was awarded.)	Luftwaffe	Feldwebel	Zugführer (platoon leader) in the 10./Fallschirmjäger-Regiment 3	22 February 1942	—	A man wearing a camouflage military uniform, steel helmet and a neck order in the shape of a cross.
Hans-Hermann Sassenberg	Heer	Leutnant	Zugführer (platoon leader) in the 2./Panzer-Aufklärungs-Abteilung 13	23 October 1941	—	
Carl Sattig	Luftwaffe	Hauptmann	Staffelkapitän of the 6./Jagdgeschwader 54	19 September 1942	—	—
Georg Sattler+	Luftwaffe	Leutnant	Pilot in the 1.(K)/Lehrgeschwader 1	5 February 1944	Awarded 675th Oak Leaves 6 December 1944	—
Günter Sattler	Heer	Hauptmann (Note: According to Scherzer as Hauptmann of the Reserves.)	Commander of the II./Grenadier-Regiment 520	15 May 1944	—	—
Hans-Karl Sattler	Luftwaffe	Oberleutnant	Pilot in the 8./Sturzkampfgeschwader 77	16 February 1942	—	—
Karl Sattler	Waffen-SS	SS-Sturmbannführer	Leader of SS-Regiment "Sattler" (Note: According to Scherzer as leader of SS-Regiment "Sattler" (SS-Unterführer-Schule Radolfzell) (189. Infanterie-Division).)	16 January 1945	—	—
Dietrich von Saucken+	Heer	Generalmajor	Leader of the 4. Panzer-Division	6 January 1942	Awarded 281st Oak Leaves 22 August 1943; 46th Swords 31 January 1944; 27th Diamonds 8 May 1945	
Hans Sauer	Luftwaffe	Leutnant	Pilot in the 4.(K)/Lehrgeschwader 1	5 July 1941	—	—
Hermann Sauer	Heer	Oberst	Commander of Festungs-Grenadier-Regiment "Sauer" in the fortress Breslau (Note: According to Scherzer as commander of Regiment "Sauer" in the fortress Breslau.)	30 April 1945	—	—
Johann Sauer	Heer	Hauptmann of the Reserves	Commander of the I./Panzergrenadier-Regiment 93	15 May 1944	—	—
Konrad Sauer+	Heer	Wachtmeister of the Reserves (Note: According to Scherzer as Wachtmeister.)	Zugführer (platoon leader) in the 3./Sturmgeschütz-Abteilung 209	26 September 1942	Awarded 603rd Oak Leaves 30 September 1944	—
Walter Sauer	Heer	Major	Commander of the II./Füsilier-Regiment 230	14 April 1945	—	—
Rudolf Sauerbrei	Heer	Hauptmann	Commander of the II./Grenadier-Regiment 405	5 April 1945	—	—
Peter Sauerbruch	Heer	Hauptmann im Generalstab (in the General Staff)	Ib (Quartermaster general) of the 14. Panzer-Division and leader of Kampfgruppe "Sauerbruch"	4 January 1943	—	—
Konrad Saul	Heer	Unteroffizier	Group leader in the 1./Grenadier-Regiment 337	9 April 1943*	Died of wounds 27 February 1943	—
Jordan Sauter? (Note: No evidence of the award to Jordan Sauter can be found in the German Federal Archives. According to Von Seemen verified by his pay book and written communication with the German Federal Archives. The presentation should have been made via the Army Group Vistula and subsequently via the Außenstelle of the Heerespersonalamt (HPA/A—Branch of the Army Staff Office). Sauter however is not listed in the records of the HPA/A. The author Veit Scherzer was denied access to files, which could help clarify the case, of the Association of Knight's Cross Recipients (AKCR) on the grounds of the Bundesarchivgesetz (German Archive Law). Sauter was a member of the AKCR.)	Heer	Hauptmann of the Reserves	Commander of the II./Regiment "Theodor Körner"	7 May 1945	—	—
Bernhard Sauvant+	Heer	Major	Commander of the I./Panzer-Regiment 36	30 November 1942	Awarded 260th Oak Leaves 28 July 1943	—
Karl Sawatzki	Heer	Feldwebel	Zugführer (platoon leader) in the 14.(Panzerjäger)/Grenadier-Regiment 3 (Note: According to Scherzer as Zugführer (platoon leader) in the 14./Grenadier-Regiment 3.)	23 February 1944	—	—
Otto Sawatzki	Heer	Oberfeldwebel	Zugführer (platoon leader) in the 14.(Panzerjäger)/Infanterie-Regiment 505 (Note: According to Scherzer as Zugführer (platoon leader) in the 14./Infanterie-Regiment 505.)	8 September 1941	—	—
Otto Sawatzki	Heer	Oberfeldwebel	Zugführer (platoon leader) in the 3./Pionier-Bataillon 21	10 September 1944*	Killed in action 15 August 1944	—
Ludwig-Ferdinand Prinz von Sayn-Wittgenstein-Berleburg	Heer	Oberstleutnant	Commander of Kavallerie-Regiment Süd	20 January 1944*	Killed in action 22 November 1943	—
Heinrich Prinz zu Sayn-Wittgenstein+	Luftwaffe	Hauptmann	Staffelkapitän of the 9./Nachtjagdgeschwader 2	2 October 1942 (Note: According to Scherzer the Knight's Cross was awarded on 7 October 1942.)	Awarded 290th Oak Leaves 31 August 1943; 44th Swords 23 January 1944	
Ferdinand Schaal	Heer	Generalleutnant	Commander of the 10. Panzer-Division	13 July 1940	—	—
Gerhard Schaar	Kriegsmarine	Oberleutnant zur See	Commander of U-957	1 October 1944	—	—
Herbert Schaarschmidt	Luftwaffe	Unteroffizier	In the III./Flak-Regiment 40 (Note: According to Scherzer in the 3./Flak-Regiment 40.)	9 February 1945	—	—
Helmut Schaarschuh	Heer	Hauptmann	Commander of the I./Füsilier-Regiment 22	4 October 1944	—	—
Hans Schabschneider	Waffen-SS	SS-Unterscharführer	Ammunitions squadron leader in the 5./SS-Panzer-Artillerie-Regiment 2 "Das Reich" (Note: According to Scherzer as ammunitions squadron leader in the 4./SS-Panzer-Artillerie-Regiment 2.)	27 August 1944	—	—
Max Schachner	Waffen-SS	SS-Obersturmführer of the Reserves	Leader of the 2./SS-Panzer-Jäger-Abteilung 8 "Florian Geyer" (Note: According to Scherzer as leader of the 2./SS-Panzer-Jäger-Abteilung 8.)	14 May 1944*	Killed in action 19 October 1943	—
Gerhard Schacht	Luftwaffe	Leutnant	Leader Sturmgruppe "Beton" (assault group concrete) in the Fallschirmjäger-Sturmabteilung "Koch" (Note: According to Scherzer as leader Sturmgruppe "Beton" (assault group concrete) in the Luftlande-Sturmabteilung "Koch".)	12 May 1940	—	—
Harro Schacht	Kriegsmarine	Korvettenkapitän	Commander of U-507	9 January 1943	—	—
Heinz Schacht	Heer	Leutnant of the Reserves	Zugführer (platoon leader) in the 2./Panzer-Jäger-Abteilung 158	19 January 1943	—	—
Friedrich-August Schack+	Heer	Oberst	Commander of Infanterie-Regiment 392	24 July 1941	Awarded 597th Oak Leaves 21 September 1944	A man wearing a military uniform with an Iron Cross displayed at the front of his uniform collar.
Günther Schack+	Luftwaffe	Leutnant	Pilot in the 9./Jagdgeschwader 51 "Mölders"	29 October 1943	Awarded 460th Oak Leaves 20 April 1944	—
Hans-Marcel von Schack (Note: According to Scherzer his full name was Hans-Marcel von Schack, and he received the Knight's Cross of the Iron Cross as leader of SS-Kavallerie-Regiment 16.)	Heer	Major	Leader of SS-Kavallerie-Regiment 16 "Florian Geyer"	27 January 1945	—	—
Karl-Heinz Schade	Heer	Leutnant (Note: According to Scherzer as Leutnant of the Reserves.)	Company leader in Panzer-Pionier-Bataillon 92	2 September 1944	—	—
Martin Schächter	Luftwaffe	Leutnant	Leader Sturmgruppe "Eisen" (assault group iron) in the Fallschirmjäger-Sturmabteilung "Koch" (Note: According to Scherzer as leader Sturmgruppe "Eisen" (assault group iron) in the Luftlande-Sturmabteilung "Koch".)	12 May 1940	—	—
Gottfried Schädlich	Heer	Hauptmann	Commander of the I./Grenadier-Regiment 514	9 July 1944	—	—
Albert Schäfer	Heer	Obergefreiter	Machine gunner in 1./Panzergrenadier-Regiment 33	12 September 1944 (Note: According to Scherzer on 2 September 1944.)	—	—
Eberhard Schäfer	Luftwaffe	Leutnant	Commando leader in the Royal Hungarian combat squadron (Kampfstaffel) in the III./Kampfgeschwader 4 "General Wever" (Note: According to Scherzer on 7 April 1944 as pilot in the III.Kampfgeschwader 3.)	20 April 1944	—	—
Eduard Schaefer	Heer	Major	Commander of the I./Grenadier-Regiment 72	23 August 1943	—	—
Eduard Schäfer	Heer	Oberleutnant	Leader of the II./Grenadier-Regiment 1115	10 February 1945*	Died of wounds 6 February 1945	—
Elmar Schaefer	Luftwaffe	Oberleutnant	Pilot in the 1./Sturzkampfgeschwader 1 (Note: According to Scherzer as pilot in the I./Sturzkampfgeschwader 1.)	8 May 1940	—	—
Erich Schäfer	Heer	Hauptmann of the Reserves	Commander of the II./Ski-Jäger-Regiment 2	31 January 1945*	Killed in action 26 January 1945	—
Ernst Schäfer	Waffen-SS	SS-Sturmbannführer	Commander of the III./SS-Infanterie-Regiment 10 (motorized) (Note: According to Scherzer as commander of the III./SS-Grenadier-Regiment (motorized) 10.)	14 October 1943	—	
Friedrich Schäfer	Luftwaffe	Oberleutnant	Staffelführer of the 4./Kampfgeschwader 200 (Note: According to Scherzer as leader of a Kampfgruppe of the II./Kampfgeschwader 200 (airborne mission against the Résistance on the Vercors Plateau southwest of Grenoble, France).)	24 October 1944	—	A man wearing a peaked cap, military uniform with an Iron Cross displayed at the front of his uniform collar.
Georg Schäfer (Note: According to Scherzer name is Johann Georg Schäfer.)	Heer	Feldwebel	Zugführer (platoon leader) in the 2./Panzer-Regiment 1	17 December 1942	—	—
[Dr.] Günther Schäfer	Heer	Leutnant of the Reserves	Leader of a Kampfgruppe der Schule für Fahnenjunker der Infanterie VI. (Note: According to Scherzer in an emergency unit of the Fahnenjunker Schule VI/Kampfgruppe Krause (462. Infanterie-Division).)	3 November 1944	—	—
Hans-Joachim Schäfer	Luftwaffe	Major	Commander of the I./Flak-Regiment 54 (motorized)	10 October 1944 (Note: According to Scherzer on 18 November 1944.)	—	—
Heinrich Schäfer	Luftwaffe	Oberfeldwebel	Zugführer (platoon leader) in the 4./Jäger-Regiment "Hermann Göring"	8 August 1944	—	—
Karl Schäfer? (Note: Karl Schäfer's nomination by his unit was processed by the Oberkommando der Luftwaffe/Auszeichnung und Disziplin (OKL/AuD—Air Force High Command/Award and Discipline) on 15 April 1945. This nomination, now recommending approval, was forwarded on 16 April with a Luftwaffenpersonalamt-Verleihungsvorschlag (LPA-VV—Air Force Staff Office Nomination Recommendation) Nr. 1575 to the adjutancy of Hermann Göring. The nomination was never finalized and remained pending at the end of the war. A presentation of the Knight's Cross of the Iron Cross cannot be verified. The presentation date stated by Walther-Peer Fellgiebel is the forwarding date to the adjutancy of the Reichsmarschall.)	Luftwaffe	Oberfeldwebel	Pilot in the 14.(Eis)/Kampfgeschwader 55	16 April 1945	—	—
Kurt Schäfer	Heer	Hauptmann	Battalion commander in Grenadier-Regiment 516	29 January 1943	—	—
Kurt Schäfer	Heer	Hauptmann	Leader of the I./Panzergrenadier-Regiment 33	12 August 1944	—	—
Max Schäfer+	Waffen-SS	SS-Obersturmbannführer	Commander of SS-Panzer-Pionier-Bataillon 5 "Wiking" (Note: According to Scherzer as commander of SS-Panzer-Pionier-Bataillon 5.)	12 February 1943	Awarded 714th Oak Leaves 25 January 1945	—
Oskar Schäfer	Waffen-SS	SS-Untersturmführer	Leader of the 3./schwere SS-Panzer-Abteilung 503	29 April 1945	—	—
Rudi Schäfer	Heer	Gefreiter	Group leader in the II./Grenadier-Regiment 1082	11 March 1945	—	—
Peter Schägger	Heer	Major of the Reserves (Note: According to Scherzer as Major.)	Commander of Panzer-Aufklärungs-Abteilung 23	16 September 1943	—	—
Bernd Schäzle	Heer	Leutnant of the Reserves	Zugführer (platoon leader) in the 11./Grenadier-Regiment 380	3 January 1944	—	—
Willi Schaffner	Heer	Obergefreiter	In the 9./Grenadier-Regiment 61	26 October 1943	—	—
Hartmut Schairer	Luftwaffe	Oberleutnant	Staffelkapitän of the 7./Sturzkampfgeschwader 1 (Note: According to Scherzer as pilot in the III./Sturzkampfgeschwader 1.)	30 August 1941	—	—
Johann Schalanda+	Luftwaffe	Oberleutnant	Pilot in the 8./Sturzkampfgeschwader 1	3 April 1943	Awarded 630th Oak Leaves 24 October 1944	—
Kurt Schaldach	Heer	Obergefreiter	Gun leader in the 2./Panzer-Jäger-Abteilung 340	9 August 1942	—	—
Johann Schalk	Luftwaffe	Oberstleutnant	Gruppenkommandeur of the III./Zerstörergeschwader 26 "Horst Wessel"	5 September 1940	—	
Franz Schall	Luftwaffe	Leutnant	Staffelführer in the I./Jagdgeschwader 52 (Note: According to Scherzer as Staffelführer of the 3./Jagdgeschwader 52.)	10 October 1944	—	—
Rudolf Schallenberg	Heer	Hauptmann	Leader of the I./Grenadier-Regiment 289	10 September 1944	—	—
Walter Schalles	Luftwaffe	Oberfeldwebel	Pilot in the 9./Kampfgeschwader 27 "Boelcke"	12 April 1942	—	—
Siegfried Schaper	Heer	Major	Deputy leader of Grenadier-Regiment 3 (Note: According to Scherzer as leader of Grenadier-Regiment 3.)	20 October 1944*	Killed in action 20 September 1944	—
Emil Schareina	Heer	Oberfeldwebel	Zugführer (platoon leader) in the 8.(MG)/Grenadier-Regiment 24 (Note: According to Scherzer as Zugführer (platoon leader) in the 8./Grenadier-Regiment 24.)	10 May 1943	—	—
Heinz Scharf	Heer	Wachtmeister	Gun leader in the 3./Sturmgeschütz-Brigade 202	17 August 1944	—	—
Helmut Scharf	Heer	Gefreiter	In the 3./Panzergrenadier-Regiment 11	20 July 1944*	Killed in action 14 May 1944	—
Konrad Scharf	Heer	Hauptmann	Commander of the I./Grenadier-Regiment 61	5 April 1945	—	—
Heinrich Scharff	Heer	Oberleutnant	Chief of the 1./Grenadier-Regiment 109	23 August 1943	—	—
Hermann Scharnagel+	Heer	Hauptmann	Commander of Pionier-Bataillon 173	6 October 1943	Awarded 602nd Oak Leaves 30 September 1944	—
Kurt Schaßner	Heer	Major	Leader of Gebirgsjäger-Regiment 91	26 December 1944	—	—
Heinrich Schaten? (Note: Heinrich Schatten's nomination was submitted to the Heerespersonalamt (HPA—Army Staff Office) on 19 April 1945. The book of "Verliehene Ritterkreuze" (Awarded Knight Crosses) contains an entry under Nr. 5176 stating the entry date 19 April 1945 and Major Joachim Domaschk approval "Knight's Cross yes". The file contains no further evidence of the approval or presentation of the award. The registry containing the approved or rejected nominations or deferred nominations contains his file card. According to the Association of Knight's Cross Recipients (AKCR) the award was presented in accordance with the Dönitz-decree. This is illegal according to the Deutsche Dienststelle (WASt) and lacks legal justification. The presentation date was assigned by Walther-Peer Fellgiebel.)	Heer	Oberfeldwebel	Zugführer (platoon leader) in the 6./Grenadier-Regiment 1	9 May 1945	—	—
Bruno Schatz	Heer	Oberst	Commander of Grenadier-Regiment 977	9 December 1944	—	—
Oskar Schaub	Heer	Oberleutnant	Chief of the 1./Panzergrenadier-Regiment 12	22 April 1943	—	—
Georg Schauer	Heer	Oberleutnant of the Reserves	Squadron leader in Divisions-Füsilier-Bataillon (A.A.) 320 (Note: According to Scherzer as leader of the 1./Divisions-Füsilier-Bataillon 320.)	21 October 1943	—	—
Horst Schaumann	Heer	Leutnant of the Reserves	Leader of the 3./Grenadier-Regiment 2	17 April 1945	—	—
Heinrich Freiherr von Schaumberg	Heer	Oberleutnant	Chief of the Panzer-Jäger-Kompanie 1131	14 April 1945*	Killed in action 28 January 1945	—
Heinz-Eugen Schauwecker	Heer	Oberleutnant of the Reserves	Chief of the 7./Panzergrenadier-Regiment 115	31 December 1944	—	—
Günther Scheel	Luftwaffe	Leutnant	Staffelführer of the 3./Jagdgeschwader 54 (Note: According to Scherzer as pilot in the 3./Jagdgeschwader 54.)	5 December 1943	—	—
Alfons Scheele	Heer	Obergefreiter	Machine gunner and messenger in the II./Grenadier-Regiment 405	30 September 1944	—	—
Hans-Karl von Scheele+	Heer	Oberst	Commander of Infanterie-Regiment 191	4 July 1940	Awarded 217th Oak Leaves 2 April 1943	—
Rudolf Scheffel	Luftwaffe	Leutnant	Staffelführer of the 1./Zerstörergeschwader 1	29 October 1942	—	—
Konrad Scheffold	Heer	Oberleutnant	Leader of the 1./Pionier-Bataillon 24	18 April 1943	—	—
Gerhard Scheibe	Luftwaffe	Oberfeldwebel	Bordfunker (radio/wireless operator) in the I./Nachtjagdgeschwader 1	10 December 1943	—	—
Siegfried Scheibe? (Note: Siegfried Scheibe's nomination was received by the Heerespersonalamt (HPA—Army Staff Office) on 2 April 1945, the number 5047 had been created and according to the file card forwarded for further processing on 11 April 1945. No further comments or notes indicate that the nomination was finalized. Mr Meentz of the German Federal Archives stated on 20 July 2004 that it cannot be verified that Scheibe received the Knight's Cross. Walther-Peer Fellgiebel assigned the presentation date of 11 May 1945. Krätschmer claims that the award was approved on 9 May 1945.)	Waffen-SS	SS-Obersturmbannführer	Commander of SS-Freiwilligen-Panzergrenadier-Regiment 48 "General Seyffardt"	11 May 1945	—	—
Erich Scheibig	Heer	Oberfeldwebel	Zugführer (platoon leader) in the 14.(Panzerjäger)/Grenadier-Regiment 174 (Note: According to Scherzer as Zugführer (platoon leader) in the 14./Grenadier-Regiment 174.)	15 January 1943	—	—
Johannes Scheid	Luftwaffe	Oberfeldwebel	Zugführer (platoon leader) in the 11./Grenadier-Regiment 1 "Hermann Göring"	21 June 1943	—	—
Franz Scheidies+	Heer	Oberstleutnant	Commander of Infanterie-Regiment 127 (Note: According to Scherzer as commander of Festungs-Infanterie-Regiment "C" (Divisions Stab z.b.V. 444).)	5 August 1940	Awarded 43rd Oak Leaves 31 December 1941	—
Albert Scheidig	Luftwaffe	Leutnant	Pilot in the 1.(F)/Aufklärungs-Gruppe 122 (Note: According to Scherzer as pilot in the Aufklärungsstaffel 1.(F)/122.)	16 April 1942	—	—
Fritz Schelhorn	Heer	Oberfeldwebel	Zugführer (platoon leader) in the Stabskompanie/Schützen-Regiment 66	4 September 1942	—	—
Otto Schell	Heer	Major	Commander of the III./Infanterie-Regiment 39	19 November 1941	—	—
Walter Scheller	Heer	Generalleutnant	Commander of the 9. Panzer-Division	3 April 1943	—	—
Walter Schellhase	Heer	Leutnant of the Reserves	Battery officer in the 6./Werfer-Regiment 52	30 October 1943	—	—
Wolfgang Schellmann	Luftwaffe	Major	Geschwaderkommodore of Jagdgeschwader 2 "Richthofen"	18 September 1940	—	—
Conrad Schellong	Waffen-SS	SS-Obersturmbannführer	Commander of the SS-Freiwilligen-Sturmbrigade "Langemark" (Note: According to Scherzer as commander of the 6. SS-Freiwilligen-Sturmbrigade "Langemark".)	28 February 1945	—	—
Hans Schellong	Luftwaffe	Oberleutnant	Staffelkapitän of the 3./Kampfgeschwader 4 "General Wever"	8 August 1944	—	—
Günther Schemm	Heer	Hauptmann (Note: According to Scherzer as Hauptmann of the Reserves.)	Leader of the I./Panzergrenadier-Regiment 11	6 October 1944	—	—
Günther Schemmel	Heer	Major	Commander of the I./Panzergrenadier-Regiment 14	6 October 1942	—	—
Wolfgang Schenck+	Luftwaffe	Oberleutnant	Staffelkapitän of the 1./Schnellkampfgeschwader 210	14 August 1941	Awarded 139th Oak Leaves 30 October 1942	The head of a young man, shown in semi-profile. He wears a military uniform with an eagle above his right breast pocket, an iron cross is displayed at the front of his shirt collar. His hair is dark, short and combed to the back, his nose is long and straight, and his facial expression is determined; looking to the right of the camera.
Rudi Schenk	Heer	Major	Commander of the II./Grenadier-Regiment 547	8 August 1944	—	—
Georg Schentke	Luftwaffe	Oberfeldwebel	Pilot in the 9./Jagdgeschwader 3	4 September 1941	—	—
Joachim Schepke+	Kriegsmarine	Kapitänleutnant	Commander of U-100	24 September 1940	Awarded 7th Oak Leaves 1 December 1940	
Rolf Scherenberg	Heer	Oberst	Commander of Grenadier-Regiment 532	26 March 1943	—	—
Fritz Scherer	Heer	Hauptmann	Chief of the 2./Sturmgeschütz-Abteilung 236	14 December 1943	—	—
Theodor Scherer+	Heer	Generalmajor	Commander of the 281. Sicherungs-Division	20 February 1942	Awarded 92nd Oak Leaves 5 May 1942	A black-and-white photograph of a man wearing a military uniform and a neck order in shape of an Iron Cross. He is wearing glasses and is looking up into the sky.
Fritz Scherf	Heer	Oberfeldwebel	Zugführer (platoon leader) in the 2./Panzer-Abteilung 103	30 September 1944*	Killed in action 29 May 1944	—
Walter Scherf	Heer	Oberleutnant of the Reserves	Chief of the 3./schwere Panzer-Abteilung 503	23 February 1944	—	—
Karl-Heinz Scherfling	Luftwaffe	Oberfeldwebel	Pilot in the 12./Nachtjagdgeschwader 1	8 April 1944	—	—
Johannes Scherg	Waffen-SS	SS-Obersturmführer	Chief of the 1./SS-Polizei-Panzer-Aufklärungs-Abteilung 4	23 October 1944	—	—
Heinrich Scherhorn? (Note: From August 1944 to May 1945 the Soviets successfully managed to deceive the Oberkommando des Heeres and let them believe that a cut off German battle group under the leadership of Oberstleutnant Heinrich Scherhorn was encircled at the Berezina. Scherhorn however had been taken prisoner of war in July 1944 and knew nothing of this operation. The deceit was so successful that the Germans continued to resupply the encircled troops by air. The last mission was flown on 17 April 1945. Hitler had awarded Scherhorn the Knight's Cross of the Iron Cross on 23 March which was dropped into the pocket on this last mission. The presentation is illegal since it was based on an illusion created by the NKVD. Furthermore, Scherhorn refused to accept the award after the war.)	Heer	Oberstleutnant	Commander of Sicherungs-Regiment 36	23 March 1945	—	—
Ewald Scherling	Heer	Obergefreiter	Machine gunner in the 9./Grenadier-Regiment 15 (motorized)	26 January 1944*	Killed in action 22 January 1944	—
Franz Scherzer	Waffen-SS	SS-Obersturmführer of the Reserves	Leader of the I./SS-Panzer-Regiment 10 "Frundsberg" (Note: According to Scherzer as leader of the I./SS-Panzer-Regiment 10.)	28 March 1945	—	—
Harald Scheuermann	Heer	Oberleutnant of the Reserves	Leader of the 2./Divisions-Füsilier-Bataillon 31 (Note: According to Scherzer as leader of the 2./Divisions-Füsilier-Bataillon 31 (A.A.).)	4 May 1944	—	—
Paul Scheuerpflug+	Heer	Oberst	Commander of Infanterie-Regiment 116	6 September 1942	Awarded 791st Oak Leaves 16 March 1945	—
Kurt Scheunemann	Heer	Feldwebel	Panzer commander and Zugführer (platoon leader) in the 2./Panzer-Regiment "Führer Begleit Brigade" (Note: According to Scherzer as Zugführer (platoon leader) in the 2./Panzer-Regiment "Führer Begleit Brigade".)	8 January 1945	—	—
Walter Scheunemann+	Heer	Oberleutnant (Note: According to Scherzer as Oberleutnant of the Reserves.)	Chief of the 9./Infanterie-Regiment 272	5 August 1940	Awarded 202nd Oak Leaves 6 March 1943	—
Georg Schewe	Kriegsmarine	Kapitänleutnant	Commander of U-105	23 May 1941	—	—
Fritz Schewior	Heer	Oberleutnant of the Reserves	Leader of Panzer-Jäger-Kompanie 1028	18 February 1945	—	—
Hans-Joachim Schibau	Luftwaffe	Oberleutnant	Chief of the 8./Flak-Regiment 36	4 November 1941	—	—
Wilhelm Schiele	Heer	Hauptmann	Commander of II./Grenadier-Regiment 305	18 July 1944	—	—
Alfred Schiemann	Heer	Obergefreiter	Group leader in the 1./Grenadier-Regiment 87 (motorized)	28 April 1943	—	—
Gustav Schiemann? (Note: Gustav Schiemann's nomination of the Heerespersonalamt (HPA—Army Staff Office) was ready for signature but the process was never completed. The Association of Knight's Cross Recipients (AKCR) claims that the presentation was in accordance with the Dönitz-decree. This is illegal according to the Deutsche Dienststelle (WASt) and lacks legal justification.)	Heer	Hauptmann	Commander of Feld-Ersatz-Bataillon 346	9 May 1945	—	—
Rudolf Schier	Heer	Hauptmann of the Reserves	Commander of the III./Jäger-Regiment 49	14 February 1945	—	—
Hans-Georg Schierholz	Luftwaffe	Oberfeldwebel	Bordfunker (radio/wireless operator) in the I./Nachtjagdgeschwader 3	29 October 1944	—	—
Franz Schieß	Luftwaffe	Oberleutnant	Staffelkapitän of the 8./Jagdgeschwader 53	21 June 1943	—	—
Gottlob Schill	Heer	Obergefreiter	Pak-Schütze (anti tank gunner) in the 14./Grenadier-Regiment 107 (Note: According to Scherzer as Richtschütze (gunner) in the 14./Grenadier-Regiment 107.)	28 December 1943	—	—
Curt Schille+	Heer	Hauptmann	Chief of the 3.(motorized)/Pionier-Bataillon 24 (Note: According to Scherzer as chief of the 3./Pionier-Bataillon 24.)	25 August 1942	Awarded 544th Oak Leaves 8 August 1944	—
Friedrich Schiller	Heer	Leutnant (Note: According to Scherzer on 6 January 1942 as Leutnant of the Reserves.)	Leader of the 5./Infanterie-Regiment 131	16 January 1942	—	—
Horst Schiller	Luftwaffe	Major Horst Schiller was shot down on September 12th 1943, him and 9 comrades were taken hostage. 2 managed to escape but upon returning with a German regiment they were unable to find them. He was killed in Ukraine June 02 1943. He was also awarded the Deutsche Kreuz in gold on Jan 02, 1942. Posthumously he was promoted to sgt.	Gruppenkommandeur of the I./Sturzkampfgeschwader 3	9 June 1944	—	—
Siegfried Schiller	Heer	Hauptmann	Commander of Panzer-Aufklärungs-Abteilung 16	6 April 1944	—	—
Johannes Schilling	Heer	Leutnant of the Reserves	Zugführer (platoon leader) in the 1./Infanterie-Bataillon z.b.V. 540	26 March 1943	—	—
Walter Schilling	Heer	Generalleutnant	Commander of the 17. Panzer-Division	28 July 1943*	Killed in action 21 July 1943	—
Wilhelm Schilling	Luftwaffe	Oberfeldwebel	Pilot in the 9./Jagdgeschwader 54 (Note: According to Scherzer on 3 November 1942 as pilot in the III./Jagdgeschwader 54.)	10 October 1942	—	
Johannes Schimanski	Heer	Major	Commander of the I./Grenadier-Regiment 408	5 March 1945	—	—
Hugo Schimmel	Heer	Hauptmann	Commander of the III./Infanterie-Regiment 41 (motorized)	23 January 1942	—	—
Josef Schimmele	Heer	Obergefreiter	Richtschütze (gunner) in the 14./Füsilier-Regiment 34	8 August 1944	—	—
Theodor Graf Schimmelmann von Lindenburg	Heer	Major	Commander of the II./Panzer-Regiment 15	14 May 1941	—	—
Dipl.-Ing. Richard Schimpf	Luftwaffe	Generalleutnant	Commander of the 3. Fallschirmjäger-Division	6 October 1944	—	—
Herbert Schimpff	Heer	Oberst of the Reserves	Commander of Grenadier-Regiment 171	24 July 1943	—	—
Horst Schimpke	Luftwaffe	Leutnant	Zugführer (platoon leader) in the 1./Fallschirm-Panzer-Jäger-Abteilung 1	5 September 1944	—	—
Walter Schindler	Heer	Hauptmann of the Reserves	Commander of the III./Grenadier-Regiment 106	4 May 1944	—	—
Ernst Schirlitz	Kriegsmarine	Vizeadmiral	Commander of fortress La Rochelle (Note: According to Scherzer as commander Atlantic coast and commander of fortress La Rochelle.)	11 March 1945	—	
Berthold Schirmer	Heer	Major	Commander of the I./Grenadier-Regiment 32	27 August 1944	—	—
Gerhart Schirmer+	Luftwaffe	Hauptmann	Leader of the II./Fallschirmjäger-Regiment 2 (Note: According to Scherzer as chief of the II./Fallschirmjäger-Regiment 2.)	14 June 1941	Awarded 657th Oak Leaves 18 November 1944	—
Konrad Schirmer	Heer	Leutnant of the Reserves	Zugführer (platoon leader) in the 3./Pionier-Bataillon 389	31 July 1942	—	—
Lothar Schirner	Luftwaffe	Gefreiter	Geschützkanonier (gunner) in the 19./Flak-Regiment "Hermann Göring" (Note: According to Scherzer as Kanonier (gunner) in the 19./Fallschirm-Flak-Regiment "Hermann Göring".)	19 February 1945	—	—
Werner Schirp	Heer	Hauptmann	Chief of the 4./Panzer-Regiment 6	28 March 1945	—	—
Fritz Schirrmacher	Heer	Oberleutnant	Chief of the 3./Panzer-Pionier-Bataillon 13	14 May 1941	—	—
Karl Schitthelm	Heer	Obergefreiter	Messenger in the 6./Panzergrenadier-Regiment 66	7 February 1945	—	—
Hans Schlagberger	Heer	Leutnant of the Reserves	Adjutant in the I./Grenadier-Regiment 988	31 January 1945	—	—
Walter Schlags-Koch+	Heer	Major of the Reserves	Commander of the I./Grenadier-Regiment 365	5 September 1944	Awarded (876th) Oak Leaves 9 May 1945? (Note: The Heerespersonalamt (HPA—Army Staff Office) received Walter Schlags-Koch's nomination via wireless communication on 6 April 1945. Major Joachim Domaschk requested via wireless communication the advisory opinion of the 2. Armee. Presumably this statement was not received yet on 28 April because Domaschk decided to postpone the decision and ordered the re-presentation for 8 May, which was never processed. The entry date for the wireless nomination of 6 April 1945 is noted on the nomination list of the higher grade of the Knight's Cross of the Iron Cross with Oak Leaves. However no other date is listed, the section comments states "unprocessed". The Order Commission of the Association of Knight's Cross Recipients (AKCR) processed this case in 1973 and decided: "877 Oak Leaves". Scherzer claims that this decision was not approved by Gerhard von Seemann—author of various publications regarding the Knight's Cross of the Iron Cross—since Schlags-Koch is not listed as an Oak Leaves recipient in his book Die Ritterkreuzträger 1939–1945 (2nd edition from 1976). The presentation number was later changed by Walther-Peer Fellgiebel to "876". However Schlags-Koch is listed by Von Seemen as the 876th Oak Leaves recipient. The presentation date was assigned by Fellgiebel. Schlags-Koch was a member of the AKCR.)	—
Karl Schlamelcher	Waffen-SS	SS-Sturmbannführer	Leader of the III./SS-Artillerie-Regiment 5 "Wiking" (Note: According to Scherzer as leader of the III./SS-Artillerie-Regiment 5.)	1 March 1942	—	—
Wilhelm Schlang	Heer	Feldwebel	Zugführer (platoon leader) in the 2./Panzer-Jäger-Abteilung z.b.V. 2 (Note: According to Scherzer as Zugführer (platoon leader) in the 2./Panzer-Jäger-Abteilung 2.)	22 August 1943	—	—
Hans von Schlebrügge	Heer	Major	Commander of the I./Gebirgsjäger-Regiment 139	20 June 1940	—	—
Wilhelm Schlecht	Heer	Oberfeldwebel	Zugführer (platoon leader) in the 6./Sturm-Regiment 195	23 July 1943	—	—
Joachim Schlee	Heer	Oberst	Commander of Grenadier-Regiment 338	16 April 1943	—	—
Rudolf Schlee+	Heer	Oberfeldwebel	Zugführer (platoon leader) in the 6./Gebirgsjäger-Regiment 13	23 October 1941	Awarded 222nd Oak Leaves 6 April 1943	—
Hans Schleef	Luftwaffe	Feldwebel	Pilot in the 7./Jagdgeschwader 3 "Udet"	9 May 1942	—	—
Wilhelm Schleef	Heer	Obergefreiter	Machine gunner in the 7./Panzergrenadier-Regiment 66	11 December 1943	—	—
Heinz Schlegel	Heer	Oberst	Commander of Grenadier-Regiment 222	23 October 1944	—	—
Hermann Schleinhege	Luftwaffe	Leutnant (Note: According to Scherzer as Leutnant of the Reserves.)	Pilot in the 8./Jagdgeschwader 54	28 January 1945	—	—
Siegmund Freiherr von Schleinitz	Heer	Generalleutnant	Commander of the 9. Infanterie-Division	14 August 1943	—	—
Alfred Schlemm	Luftwaffe	General der Fallschirmtruppe	Commanding general of the I. Fallschirmkorps	11 June 1944	—	
Dipl.-Ing. Hans Schlemmer+	Heer	Generalmajor	Commander of the 134. Infanterie-Division	21 April 1942	Awarded 369th Oak Leaves 18 January 1944	
Erich Schlemminger	Heer	Major	Commander of Divisions-Füsilier-Bataillon 168 (Note: According to Scherzer as commander of Divisions-Füsilier-Bataillon (A.A.) 168.)	29 February 1944	—	—
Eberhard Schlepple	Heer	Oberleutnant of the Reserves	Leader of Panzer-Aufklärungs-Abteilung 26	27 July 1944	—	—
Otto Schlesiger	Heer	Major	Commander of the II./Grenadier-Regiment 1	21 April 1944	—	—
Friedrich-Ferdinand Prinz zu Schleswig-Holstein-Sonderburg-Glücksburg	Heer	Major im Generalstab (in the General Staff)	Commander of Panzergrenadier-Regiment 40	22 February 1945	—	—
Joachim Schlichting	Luftwaffe	Hauptmann	Gruppenkommandeur of the III./Jagdgeschwader 27	14 December 1940	—	
Karl-Wilhelm von Schlieben	Heer	Oberst	Commander of Brigade Stab. z.b.V. 4 and leader of the 208. Infanterie-Division	17 March 1943	—	—
Franz Schlieper	Heer	Oberst	Commander of Grenadier-Brigade 1132 and leader of the 73. Infanterie-Division (Note: According to Scherzer as commander of Grenadier-Brigade 1132.)	21 September 1944	—	—
Fritz Schlieper	Heer	Generalmajor	Commander of the 45. Infanterie-Division	27 December 1941	—	
Hermann Schliermann	Luftwaffe	Oberfeldwebel	Pilot in the 5./Transportgeschwader 4 (Note: According to Scherzer as pilot in the Transportgeschwader 4.)	31 October 1944	—	—
Kurt Schließmann	Heer	Hauptmann	Chief of the 1./Sturmgeschütz-Brigade 286	18 January 1945	—	—
Harry Schlingmann	Heer	Hauptmann (Note: According to Scherzer as Hauptmann of the Reserves.)	Commander of Pionier-Bataillon 112	14 February 1944	—	—
Egon-Reiner von Schlippenbach	Kriegsmarine	Kapitänleutnant	Commander of U-453	19 November 1943	—	—
Helmuth Schlömer+	Heer	Oberst	Commander of Schützen-Regiment 5	2 October 1941	Awarded 161st Oak Leaves 23 December 1942	—
Heinrich Schlosser	Luftwaffe	Oberleutnant of the Reserves	Pilot in the 2./Kampfgeschwader 40	18 September 1941	—	A smiling man wearing a military uniform with an Iron Cross displayed at the front of his uniform collar.
Walter Schlosser	Heer	Leutnant of the Reserves	Zugführer (platoon leader) in the 2./Infanterie-Regiment 456	16 September 1942	—	—
Carl Schlottmann	Heer	Major of the Reserves	Commander of Pionier-Bataillon 168	19 September 1943	—	—
Adolf Schlüter	Heer	Hauptmann	Commander of the II./Grenadier-Regiment 368	1 February 1945	—	—
Wilhelm Schlüter	Waffen-SS	SS-Sturmbannführer and Major of the Schupo	Leader of SS-Artillerie-Regiment 54 "Nederland" (Note: According to Scherzer as leader of SS-Artillerie-Regiment 54.)	23 August 1944	—	—
Georg Schluifelder	Waffen-SS	SS-Standartenoberjunker	Leader of the 1./SS-Freiwilligen-Panzergrenadier-Regiment 49 "De Ruyter" (Note: According to Scherzer as leader of the 1./SS-Freiwilligen-Panzergrenadier-Regiment 49 "De Ruiter".)	26 November 1944	—	—
Franz Schlund	Luftwaffe	Oberfeldwebel	Bordfunker (radio/wireless operator) in the 4.(K)/Lehrgeschwader 1	30 August 1941	—	—
Adolf Schmahl	Heer	Leutnant	Leader of the 10./Infanterie-Regiment 6	7 July 1942	—	—
Alfons Schmalz	Luftwaffe	Leutnant	Pilot in the 8./Sturzkampfgeschwader 2 "Immelmann" (Note: According to Scherzer as pilot in the I./Sturzkampfgeschwader 2 "Immelmann".)	5 April 1942	—	—
Eberhard Schmalz	Heer	Leutnant (Note: According to Scherzer as Leutnant of the Reserves.)	Zugführer (platoon leader) in the Panzer-Jäger-Kompanie 1102	11 March 1945	—	—
Wilhelm Schmalz+	Heer	Major	Commander of the I./Schützen-Regiment 11	28 November 1940	Awarded 358th Oak Leaves 23 December 1943	
Otto Schmalzried	Heer	Oberleutnant	Chief of the 12./Infanterie-Regiment 419	30 October 1941	—	—
Heinz Schmekel	Heer	Leutnant of the Reserves	Leader of the 1./Panzergrenadier-Regiment 108	27 July 1944*	Killed in action 6 June 1944	—
Jürgen Schmeling	Heer	Hauptmann	Kampfgruppen leader in der Division Deneke (Note: According to Scherzer as leader of a Kampfgruppe in der Division Deneke ("Gneisenau-Einheit" of Wehrkreis XI).)	10 February 1945	—	—
Heinrich Schmelzer+	Waffen-SS	SS-Obersturmführer of the Reserves	Leader of the 16./SS-Panzergrenadier-Regiment "Das Reich" (Note: According to Scherzer as leader of the 2./SS-Panzer-Pionier-Bataillon 2.)	12 March 1944	Awarded 756th Oak Leaves 28 February 1945	—
Bruno Schmelzinger	Heer	Unteroffizier	Rifle leader of the 4./Grenadier-Regiment 544	10 September 1944	—	—
Heinrich Schmetz	Luftwaffe	Hauptmann	Gruppenkommandeur of the III./Kampfgeschwader 100	29 October 1944	—	—
Alois Schmid	Heer	Oberfeldwebel	Zugführer (platoon leader) in the 17./Gebirgsjäger-Regiment 91	9 January 1945	—	—
Anton Schmid	Heer	Oberst	Kampfgruppen leader in the 286. Infanterie-Division	10 February 1945	—	—
Franz Schmid	Heer	Leutnant	Leader of the 3./Schnelle Abteilung 306 (Note: According to Scherzer as leader of the 3.(self motorized)/Schnelle Abteilung 306.)	21 October 1943	—	—
[Dr.] Fritz-Wilhelm Schmid	Luftwaffe	Hauptmann	Commander of the II./Fallschirm-Panzergrenadier-Regiment 2 "Hermann Göring"	6 October 1944	—	—
Georg Schmid	Heer	Leutnant of the Reserves	Adjutant in the II./Jäger-Regiment 229	2 June 1943	—	—
Günther Schmid	Luftwaffe	Leutnant	Staffelführer of the 5./Sturzkampfgeschwader 2 "Immelmann"	23 December 1942	—	—
Hans Schmid	Heer	Oberstleutnant	Commander of Grenadier-Regiment 850	13 April 1944	—	—
Johann Schmid	Luftwaffe	Hauptmann	Staffelkapitän of the 8./Jagdgeschwader 26 "Schlageter" (Note: According to Scherzer as pilot in the Stab/Jagdgeschwader 26 "Schlageter".)	21 August 1941	—	—
Joseph Schmid	Luftwaffe	Generalmajor	In the Stab of Panzer-Division "Hermann Göring" (Note: According to Scherzer as commander of the in Tunisia deployed detachment of the Panzer-Division "Hermann Göring".)	21 May 1943	—	—
Karl Schmid	Luftwaffe	Leutnant	Pilot in the 14.(Eis)/Kampfgeschwader 27 "Boelcke"	19 August 1943	—	—
Walter Schmid	Heer	Leutnant of the Reserves	Adjutant in the II./Grenadier-Regiment 390	15 May 1944	—	—
Gerhard Schmidhuber+	Heer	Oberst	Commander of Panzergrenadier-Regiment 304	18 October 1943	Awarded 706th Oak Leaves 21 January 1945	A man wearing a military uniform and peaked cap with an Iron Cross displayed at the front of his uniform collar.
Arthur Schmidt	Heer	Generalmajor	Chief of the General Staff of the 6. Armee	6 January 1943	—	—
August Schmidt+	Heer	Oberst	Commander of Infanterie-Regiment 20	27 October 1939	Awarded 371st Oak Leaves 23 January 1944	A man wearing a military uniform with an Iron Cross displayed at the front of his uniform collar.
August Schmidt	Luftwaffe	General der Flakartillerie	Commanding general and commander-in-chief of Luftgau VI (Münster)	13 February 1945 (Note: According to Scherzer on 11 February 1945.)	—	—
Burkhard Schmidt	Heer	Major	Leader of the II./Infanterie-Regiment 411	6 November 1942	—	—
[Dr.] Dietrich Schmidt	Luftwaffe	Oberleutnant	Staffelkapitän of the 8./Nachtjagdgeschwader 1	27 July 1944	—	—
Erich Schmidt	Luftwaffe	Leutnant	Pilot in the III./Jagdgeschwader 53 (Note: According to Scherzer as pilot in the 9./Jagdgeschwader 53.)	23 July 1941	—	—
Erich Schmidt+	Heer	Major	Commander of schwere Panzer-Abteilung 507 (Note: According to Scherzer as commander of Panzer-Abteilung 507.)	9 June 1944	Awarded (877th) Oak Leaves 9 May 1945? (Note: The Heerespersonalamt (HPA—Army Staff Office) received Erich Schmitt's nomination on 24 March 1945. Major Joachim Domaschk noted three days later: "Insufficient for the Oak Leaves!". Nevertheless an HAP entry nomination without a nomination number was created on 29 March and presented to General Wilhelm Burgdorf. Burgdorf noted on 31 March: "Request advisory opinion from the commanding general!" and returned the nomination to the HPA. Major Domaschk requested via teleprinter the statement of the XXXIX. Panzerkorps. The Panzerkorps answered on 5 April via teleprinter that they were not responsible since the respective division was only subordinated to the corps for a very short time and never in action. Domaschk then requested an advisory opinion from the LVII. Panzerkorps on 8 April, which was not received by 28 April. On this day Domaschk noted "Wait" and ordered the re-presentation for 5 May. The nomination remained unprocessed after this date. The nomination list of the higher grade of the Knight's Cross of the Iron Cross with Oak Leaves notes the entry date of 24 March and that the nomination was forwarded to General Burgdorf on 29 March 1945. A presentation date is not stated and a comment says "further enquiry". The Order Commission of the Association of Knight's Cross Recipients (AKCR) processed this case in 1982 and decided: "Oak Leaves yes, 9 May 1945". It appears that the AKCR had questioned a witness, the former adjutant of the Army to the Commander-in-chief of the Wehrmacht Willy Johannmeyer. He wrote to the AKCR on 29 March 1968, stating: "By all means, I cannot remember a pick-up of the Oak Leaves for Mr Oberleutnant Erich Schmidt". The presentation number "876" was assigned by the AKCR. The presentation date was assigned by the Walther-Peer Fellgiebel. Schmidt was a member of the AKCR.)	—
Erich-Otto Schmidt	Heer	Oberstleutnant	Commander of Grenadier-Regiment 679	4 August 1943	—	—
Ernst Schmidt	Heer	Leutnant of the Reserves	Leader of Divisions-Sturm-Kompanie 353 (Note: According to Scherzer as leader of Divisions-Sturm-Kompanie (353)/205. Infanterie-Division.)	24 February 1945	—	—
Franz Schmidt	Luftwaffe	Oberleutnant	Staffelkapitän in the III./Kampfgeschwader 55 (Note: According to Scherzer as Staffelkapitän of the Eisenbahn-Staffel in the III./Kampfgeschwader 55.)	19 August 1943	—	—
Friedrich Schmidt	Heer	Hauptmann	Leader of the III./Infanterie-Regiment 437	8 October 1942	—	—
Fritz Schmidt	Heer	Oberleutnant	Adjutant in the II./Grenadier-Regiment 15 (motorized)	9 December 1944*	Killed in action 20 October 1944	—
Georg Schmidt	Heer	Oberleutnant	Chief of the 6./Jäger-Regiment 56	9 December 1944	—	—
Georg Schmidt	Heer	Leutnant (Note: According to Scherzer as Leutnant of the Reserves.)	Leader of the 7./Grenadier-Regiment 173	5 February 1945	—	—
Gustav Schmidt+	Heer	Oberst	Commander of Infanterie-Regiment 74	4 September 1940	Awarded 203rd Oak Leaves 6 March 1943	—
Hans Schmidt+	Heer	Generalleutnant zur Verwendung (for disposition)	Commander of the 260. Infanterie-Division	22 September 1941	Awarded 334th Oak Leaves 24 November 1943	—
Hans Schmidt	Heer	Generalleutnant	Commander of the 275. Infanterie-Division	16 October 1944	—	—
Hans Ritter von Schmidt	Heer	Major of the Reserves	Leader of Infanterie-Regiment 546	24 August 1942	—	—
Heinz Schmidt+	Luftwaffe	Leutnant	Pilot in the 6./Jagdgeschwader 52	23 August 1942	Awarded 124th Oak Leaves 16 September 1942 (Note: According to Scherzer on 15 September 1942.)	—
Heinz Schmidt	Heer	Oberleutnant of the Reserves	Chief of the 1./Grenadier-Regiment 994	5 February 1945	—	—
Hellmut Schmidt	Heer	Hauptmann	Chief of the 1./Panzer-Regiment 10	16 September 1943	—	—
Herbert Schmidt	Luftwaffe	Oberleutnant	Chief of the 1./Fallschirmjäger-Regiment 1	24 May 1940 (Note: According to Scherzer on 29 May 1940.)	—	A man wearing a military uniform with an Iron Cross displayed at the front of his uniform collar.
Herbert Schmidt	Luftwaffe	Leutnant	Pilot in the I./Schlachtgeschwader 3	9 June 1944	—	—
Hermann Schmidt	Heer	Hauptmann	Commander of the IV./Artillerie-Regiment 81	28 June 1943	—	—
Hermann Schmidt	Luftwaffe	Major	Gruppenkommandeur of the I./Kampfgeschwader 66	20 April 1944	—	—
Hermann-Ludwig Schmidt	Heer	Oberwachtmeister	Zugführer (platoon leader) in the 2./Sturmgeschütz-Brigade 209	4 October 1944	—	—
Hubert Schmidt	Heer	Hauptmann of the Reserves	Leader of the I./Grenadier-Regiment 280	5 March 1945	—	—
Johann Schmidt	Heer	Hauptmann	Leader of the II./Infanterie-Regiment 62	18 January 1942	—	—
Dipl.-Ing. Johannes Schmidt	Heer	Oberstleutnant	Commander of the I./Panzer-Regiment 27	15 October 1942	—	—
Josef Schmidt	Heer	Oberst	Commander of Grenadier-Regiment 199 "List"	31 January 1943*	Killed in action 28 January 1943	—
Josef Schmidt	Heer	Hauptmann of the Reserves	Leader of the I./Grenadier-Regiment 159	3 December 1943	—	—
Jürgen Schmidt	Heer	Oberstleutnant im Generalstab (in the General Staff)	Ia (operations officer) in the 337. Infanterie-Division	1 May 1943*	Died of wounds 16 February 1943	—
Karl-Heinz Schmidt	Heer	Hauptmann	Leader of Festungs-Infanterie-Bataillon XIV./999 (Note: According to Scherzer as leader of the XIV. Festungs-Infanterie-Bataillon 999.)	11 June 1944	—	—
Klaus-Degenhardt Schmidt	Kriegsmarine	Oberleutnant zur See	Commander of Schnellboot S-54 in the 10. Schnellbootflottille (Note: According to Scherzer as commander of Schnellboot S-54.)	22 December 1943	—	—
Konrad Schmidt	Heer	Oberleutnant	Leader of the 12./Grenadier-Regiment 42	23 August 1943*	Killed in action 21 July 1943	—
Leonhard Schmidt? (Note: No evidence of the award can be found in the German Federal Archives. The award was unlawfully presented by the commanding general of the I Parachute Corps, General der Fallschirmtruppe Richard Heidrich.)	Luftwaffe	Hauptmann	Battalion leader in the II./Fallschirmjäger-Regiment 4	30 April 1945	—	—
Otto Schmidt	Luftwaffe	Hauptmann (Note: According to Scherzer as Oberleutnant.)	Staffelkapitän of the 7./Sturzkampfgeschwader 77	3 September 1942	—	—
[Dr.] Paul Schmidt	Luftwaffe	Leutnant	Observer in the Nahaufklärungs-Gruppe 15	3 September 1943	—	—
Richard Schmidt	Heer	Oberstleutnant	Commander of Infanterie-Regiment 473	6 November 1942	—	—
Rudolf Schmidt+	Heer	Generalleutnant	Commanding general of the XXXIX. Panzerkorps (Note: According to Scherzer as commanding general of the XXXIX. Armeekorps (mototized).)	3 June 1940	Awarded 19th Oak Leaves 10 July 1941	The head and shoulders of an elderly man, shown from the front. He wears a military uniform with an Iron Cross displayed at the front of his collar. His hair is parted, combed back and appears either dark or grey, his facial expression is a determined and grim; his eyes are looking into the camera.
Rudolf Schmidt	Luftwaffe	Feldwebel	Pilot in the 5./Jagdgeschwader 77	30 August 1941	—	—
Rudolf Schmidt	Luftwaffe	Hauptmann	Staffelkapitän of the 5./Kampfgeschwader 76	2 October 1942*	Killed in action 5 September 1942	—
Rudolf Schmidt	Luftwaffe	Hauptmann	Gruppenkommandeur of the II./Kampfgeschwader 26	28 March 1945	—	—
Walter Schmidt+	Waffen-SS	SS-Hauptsturmführer	Leader of the III./SS-Panzergrenadier-Regiment 10 "Westland" (Note: According to Scherzer as leader of the III./SS-Panzergrenadier-Regiment "Westland".)	4 August 1943	Awarded 479th Oak Leaves 14 May 1944	—
Werner Schmidt	Luftwaffe	Major	Commander of Fallschirm-MG-Bataillon 1	5 April 1944	—	—
Werner Schmidt	Luftwaffe	Hauptmann	Staffelkapitän of the 9./Kampfgeschwader 55 (Note: According to Scherzer as Staffelkapitän in the III./Kampfgeschwader 55.)	19 August 1944	—	—
Winfried Schmidt	Luftwaffe	Oberleutnant (Note: According to Scherzer as Oberleutnant of the Reserves.)	Staffelkapitän of the 8./Jagdgeschwader 3	18 September 1941	—	—
Hans-Joachim Schmidt-Falbe	Heer	Hauptmann of the Reserves	Chief of the 10./Grenadier-Regiment 323	14 May 1944	—	—
Werner Schmidt-Hammer	Heer	Generalleutnant	Commander of the 168. Infanterie-Division	12 September 1944 (Note: According to Scherzer on 2 September 1944.)	—	—
Otto Schmidt-Hartung	Heer	Oberst	Commander of Infanterie-Regiment 35	29 June 1940	—	—
Gustav-Albrecht Schmidt-Ott	Heer	Oberstleutnant	Leader of Panzer-Regiment 6	7 October 1942	—	—
Klaus Schmidtberg	Luftwaffe	Fahnenjunker-Oberfeldwebel	Pilot in the 1.(F)Nacht-Aufklärungs-Staffel (Note: According to Scherzer as pilot in the Aufklärungsstaffel 1.(F)/Nacht.)	6 October 1944	—	—
Fritz Schmidtmann	Luftwaffe	Hauptmann	Staffelkapitän of the 4./Kampfgeschwader 55	29 February 1944	—	—
Hans-Albert Schmidtmann	Heer	Oberstleutnant	Commander of Artillerie-Regiment 31	18 October 1944	—	—
Josef Schmied	Heer	Unteroffizier	Group leader in the 3./Pionier-Bataillon 198	26 January 1944	—	—
Lorenz Schmied (Note: According to Scherzer name is spelled Lorenz Schmid.)	Heer	Obergefreiter	Kompanietruppführer (company headquarters leader) in the 8./Gebirgsjäger-Regiment 100	29 November 1944	—	—
Helmut Schmischke	Heer	Hauptmann	Commander of Pionier-Bataillon 36	22 July 1943	—	—
Anton Schmitt	Heer	Feldwebel	Zugführer (platoon leader) in the 2./Grenadier-Regiment 992	16 November 1944	—	—
Artur Schmitt	Heer	Generalmajor	556th Army Rear Area Commander and leader of a Kampfgruppe (Note: According to Scherzer as Korück 556 and commander of the German-Italian forces in Bardia(Bardīya)/Libya (mostly members of the resupply units of the 21. Panzer-Division).)	5 February 1942	—	—
Erich Schmitt	Luftwaffe	Oberfeldwebel	Pilot in the 2.(F)/Aufklärungs-Gruppe 11 (Note: According to Scherzer as pilot in the Aufklärungsstaffel 2.(F)/11.)	19 September 1942	—	—
Erich Schmitt	Heer	Obergefreiter	Group leader in the 3./Grenadier-Regiment 118	8 October 1943	—	—
Jakob Schmitt	Heer	Oberfeldwebel	Zugführer (platoon leader) in the 13./Grenadier-Regiment 485	30 September 1944	—	—
Norbert Schmitt	Luftwaffe	Oberleutnant	Staffelkapitän of the 3./Schlachtgeschwader 10	28 February 1945	—	—
Stephan Schmitt	Luftwaffe	Oberleutnant	Staffelkapitän of the 5./Schlachtgeschwader 77 (Note: According to Scherzer as Staffelkapitän in the II./Schlachtgeschwader 77.)	29 October 1944	—	—
Wilhelm Schmitter+	Luftwaffe	Oberleutnant	Pilot in the II./Kampfgeschwader 2	19 September 1942	Awarded 432nd Oak Leaves 24 March 1944	—
Franz Schmitz	Heer	Sanitäts-Unteroffizier	Group leader of the 3./Grenadier-Regiment 279	13 September 1943	—	—
Günther Schmitz	Luftwaffe	Fahnenjunker-Oberfeldwebel	Pilot in the 10./Transportgeschwader 2	20 April 1944	—	—
Wilfried Schmitz	Luftwaffe	Oberleutnant	Pilot in the I./Kampfgeschwader 4 "General Wever"	21 August 1942	—	—
Franz Schmitzer	Heer	Obergefreiter	Richtschütze (gunner) in the 4./Artillerie-Regiment 6	26 September 1942	—	—
Johann Schmölzer	Heer	Oberwachtmeister	Zugführer (platoon leader) in the 1./Radfahr-Abteilung 68	24 September 1942	—	—
Siegfried Schmoll	Heer	Leutnant of the Reserves	Aide-de-camp in Grenadier-Regiment 217 (Note: According to Scherzer as aide-de-camp in Stab/Grenadier-Regiment 217.)	9 June 1944	—	—
Ernst-Friedrich Schmude? (Note: Ernst-Friedrich Schmude's nomination was received by the Heerespersonalamt (HPA—Army Staff Office) on 19 April 1945. A Heerespersonalamt-Verleihungsvorschlag (HPA-VV—Army Staff Office Nomination Recommendation) with number 5090 was created and approved on 21 April. It was sent to Wilhelm Burgdorf in Berlin as a teleprinter message on 26 April and had not been finalized by the end of the war. According to the Association of Knight's Cross Recipients (AKCR) the award was presented in accordance with the Dönitz-decree. This is illegal according to the Deutsche Dienststelle (WASt) and lacks legal justification. The presentation date was assigned by Walther-Peer Fellgiebel.)	Heer	Hauptmann	Commander of the II./Grenadier-Regiment 732	9 May 1945	—	—
[Dr.] Willi Schmückle	Heer	Fahnenjunker-Oberfeldwebel	In the 6./Fahnenjunker-Regiment 1241	15 March 1945	—	—
Hubert Schmundt	Kriegsmarine	Konteradmiral	Befehlshaber der Aufklärungs-Streitkräfte und Führer der Kampfgruppe Bergen—commander of the reconnaissance forces and leader of the battle group Bergen (Note: According to Scherzer as stellvertretender Befehlshaber der Aufklärungs-Streitkräfte und Führer der Kriegschiffgruppe 3 (Zielhafen Bergen)—(deputy commander of the reconnaissance forces and leader of the warship group 3 (destination Bergen)).)	14 June 1940	—	A man wearing a peaked cap and dark military uniform with an Iron Cross displayed at the front of his uniform collar. He is holding gloves in his hands.
Ernst Schnabl	Heer	Leutnant of the Reserves	Leader of the 9./Jäger-Regiment 204	7 February 1944	—	—
Georg Schnappauf	Heer	Major	Commander of Panzer-Regiment "Führer-Begleit-Division"	9 May 1945 (Note: According to Scherzer on 19 April 1945.)	—	—
Franz-Karl Schnarr	Heer	Oberfeldwebel	Zugführer (platoon leader) in the 13./Grenadier-Regiment 366	26 March 1944	—	—
Helmut Schnatz	Luftwaffe	Oberleutnant (Note: According to Scherzer as Oberleutnant of the Reserves.)	Leader of the 3./Flak-Regiment 25 (motorized)	17 October 1942*	Killed in action 19 September 1942	—
Alois Schnaubelt	Waffen-SS	SS-Unterscharführer	Gun leader in the 3./SS-Flak-Abteilung 5 "Wiking" (Note: According to Scherzer as gun leader in the 3./SS-Flak-Abteilung 5 .)	16 November 1944	—	—
Heinz-Wolfgang Schnaufer+	Luftwaffe	Oberleutnant	Staffelführer of the 12./Nachtjagdgeschwader 1	31 December 1943	Awarded 507th Oak Leaves 24 June 1944; 84th Swords 30 July 1944; 21st Diamonds 16 October 1944 (Note: According to Scherzer 84th Swords on 3 August 1944.)	
Ernst Schneck	Heer	Hauptmann of the Reserves (Note: According to Scherzer as Hauptmann.)	Commander of the I./Grenadier-Regiment 698	16 November 1944	—	—
Wilhelm Schneckenburger	Heer	Generalleutnant	Commander of the 125. Infanterie-Division	1 August 1942	—	—
Adalbert Schnee+	Kriegsmarine	Oberleutnant zur See	Commander of U-201	30 August 1941	Awarded 105th Oak Leaves 15 July 1942	—
Rolf Schneege	Heer	Leutnant of the Reserves	Pioneer Zugführer (platoon leader) in the Stabskompanie/Infanterie-Regiment 120 (motorized)	14 May 1941*	Killed in action 15 June 1940	—
Wolfgang Schneeweis	Luftwaffe	Oberleutnant	Pilot in the Nachtjagdschwarm of Luftflottenkommando 6	15 November 1943	—	—
Adalbert Schneider	Kriegsmarine	Korvettenkapitän	1st artillery officer on battleship Bismarck	27 May 1941	—	—
Albert Schneider	Heer	Hauptmann	Commander of Feld-Ausbau-Bataillon 178	23 December 1942	—	—
Alfred Schneider	Heer	Leutnant of the Reserves	Leader of the 9./Gebirgsjäger-Regiment 206	7 June 1942*	Killed in action 3 June 1942	—
Eckhard Schneider	Heer	Oberleutnant	Leader of the 6./Füsilier-Regiment 202	24 July 1943	—	—
Dipl.-Ing. Erich Schneider+	Heer	Generalmajor	Commander of the 4. Panzer-Division	5 May 1943	Awarded 768th Oak Leaves 6 March 1945	—
Erich Schneider	Heer	Hauptmann	Leader of the II./Panzer-Regiment 9	10 February 1944	—	—
Friedrich Schneider	Heer	Hauptmann of the Reserves	Battalion leader in Grenadier-Regiment 418	24 February 1943	—	—
Gerd-Dietrich Schneider	Kriegsmarine	Oberleutnant zur See	Chief of the 8. Artillerie-Trägerflottille	3 October 1944	—	—
Heinrich Schneider	Heer	Oberfeldwebel	Zugführer (platoon leader) in Feld-Ersatz-Bataillon 211	6 April 1944	—	—
Heinz Schneider	Heer	Oberleutnant	Leader of the 3./Panzer-Pionier-Bataillon 59	22 September 1941	—	A man wearing a peaked cap and military uniform with an Iron Cross displayed at the front of his uniform collar.
Heinz Schneider	Heer	Hauptmann (Note: According to Scherzer as Hauptmann of the Reserves.)	Commander of the II./Grenadier-Regiment 669	20 October 1944*	Killed in action 31 July 1944	—
Herbert Schneider	Kriegsmarine	Kapitänleutnant	Commander of U-522	16 January 1943	—	—
Herbert Schneider	Luftwaffe	Wachtmeister	Flak combat troop leader in the 6./Flak-Regiment 49 (motorized)	5 February 1944	—	—
Josef Schneider+	Heer	Oberfeldwebel	Zugführer (platoon leader) in the 11./Jäger-Regiment 207	27 June 1942	Awarded 389th Oak Leaves 10 February 1944	—
Josef Schneider	Heer	Oberfeldwebel	Leader of the assault platoon in the 5./Grenadier-Regiment 521	18 January 1944	—	—
Kurt Schneider	Heer	Hauptmann of the Reserves	Chief of the 7./Artillerie-Regiment 129	11 September 1943	—	—
Otto Schneider	Waffen-SS	SS-Obersturmführer	Leader of the 7./SS-Panzer-Regiment 5 "Wiking" (Note: According to Scherzer as leader of the 7./SS-Panzer-Regiment 5.)	4 May 1944	—	—
Otto Schneider	Heer	Leutnant (Note: According to Scherzer as Leutnant of the Reserves.)	Leader of Pionierkompanie/Jäger-Regiment 54	28 October 1944*	Died of wounds 16 October 1944	—
[Dr.] Paul Schneider	Heer	Hauptmann	Leader of the II./Grenadier-Regiment 959	18 November 1944	—	—
Rudolf Schneider	Heer	Oberleutnant	Chief of the 1./Panzer-Jäger-Abteilung 342 (Note: According to Scherzer as company chief of the Panzer-Jäger-Abteilung 342.)	4 October 1942	—	—
Walter-Erich Schneider	Kriegsmarine	Kapitänleutnant	Chief of the 25. Minensuchflottille	5 November 1944	—	—
Wilhelm Schneider	Heer	Wachtmeister	Shock troops leader in Stabsschwadron of the II./Reiter-Regiment 32 (Note: According to Scherzer as shock troops Zugführer (platoon leader) in the II./Reiter-Regiment 32.)	30 April 1945	—	—
Ferdinand Schneider-Kostalski	Heer	Hauptmann	Commander of the III./Panzer-Regiment 6	9 July 1941	—	—
Alfred Schneidereit	Waffen-SS	SS-Rottenführer	Anti tank rifle troop leader in the 8./SS-Panzergrenadier-Regiment 1 "Leibstandarte SS Adolf Hitler"	20 December 1943	—	—
Willy Schneidermann	Heer	Feldwebel	Group leader in the Radfahrkompanie/Grenadier-Regiment 192 (Note: According to Scherzer in the Radfahrkompanie/Grenadier-Regiment 192.)	29 June 1943	—	—
Karl Schnell	Heer	Feldwebel	Kompanietruppführer (company headquarters leader) in the 1./Grenadier-Regiment 423	2 September 1944	—	—
Karl-Heinz Schnell	Luftwaffe	Oberleutnant	Staffelkapitän of the 9./Jagdgeschwader 51 (Note: According to Scherzer as Staffelkapitän of the 8./Jagdgeschwader 51.)	1 August 1941	—	—
Siegfried Schnell+	Luftwaffe	Leutnant (Note: According to Scherzer as Leutnant of the Reserves and pilot in the 4./Jagdgeschwader 2 "Richthofen".)	Pilot in the II./Jagdgeschwader 2 "Richthofen"	9 November 1940	Awarded 18th Oak Leaves 9 July 1941	—
Wilhelm Schnepf	Heer	Leutnant	Company leader in schwere Heeres-Panzer-Jäger-Abteilung 654	31 January 1945	—	—
Otto Schniewind	Kriegsmarine	Vizeadmiral	Chef des Stabes der Seekriegsleitung im OKM (Note: According to Scherzer as Chef des Stabes der Seekriegsleitung und Chef des Marinekommando Amt im OKM.)	20 April 1940	—	
Albrecht Schnitger	Heer	Oberfeldwebel	Zugführer (platoon leader) in the 6./Infanterie-Regiment 18	7 October 1942	—	—
Herbert Schnocks? (Note: Herbert Schnocks's Heerespersonalamt-Verleihungsvorschlag (HPA-VV—Army Staff Office Nomination Recommendation) was ready for signature at the end of the war. According to the Association of Knight's Cross Recipients (AKCR) the award was presented in accordance with the Dönitz-decree. This is illegal according to the Deutsche Dienststelle (WASt) and lacks legal justification. The presentation date was assigned by Walther-Peer Fellgiebel.)	Heer	Hauptmann	Battalion commander in Grenadier-Regiment 317	8 May 1945	—	—
Karl Schnörrer	Luftwaffe	Leutnant of the Reserves	Staffelführer of the 11./Jagdgeschwader 7	22 March 1945	—	—
Herbert Schob	Luftwaffe	Oberleutnant	Pilot in the II./Zerstörergeschwader 76 (Note: According to Scherzer as pilot in the I./Zerstörergeschwader 76.)	9 June 1944	—	—
Eugen Ritter von Schobert	Heer	General der Infanterie	Commanding general of the VII. Armeekorps	29 June 1940	—	A man with mustache wearing a military uniform with an Iron Cross displayed at the front of his uniform collar.
[Dr.] Ernst Schöbitz	Luftwaffe	Oberleutnant (Note: According to Scherzer as Oberleutnant of the Reserves and Staffelkapitän of the Nahaufklärungsstaffel 11.(H)/12.)	Staffelkapitän of the 11.(H)/Aufklärungs-Gruppe 12	5 September 1944	—	—
Fritz Schöck	Heer	Hauptmann	Chief of the 2./schwere Panzer-Abteilung 507	5 September 1944	—	—
Hans Schoefbeck	Luftwaffe	Oberfeldwebel	Pilot in the 1./Kampfgruppe z.b.V. 9	14 March 1943	—	—
Josef Schölß	Luftwaffe	Hauptmann	Staffelkapitän of the 3./Kampfgeschwader 51	25 May 1943	—	—
Helmut Schoen	Heer	Feldwebel	Zugführer (platoon leader) in the 5./Jäger-Regiment 28	5 April 1944	—	—
Rudolf Schön	Heer	Leutnant of the Reserves	Leader of the 3./Pionier-Bataillon 8 (motorized) (Note: According to Scherzer as leader of the 3.(motorized)/Pionier-Bataillon 8.)	12 December 1944	—	—
Viktor Schönbeck	Heer	Hauptmann	Chief of the 13./Gebirgsjäger-Regiment 139	20 June 1940	—	—
Friedrich Schönberg	Heer	Oberstleutnant	Leader of Divisions-Gruppe 262	10 September 1944	—	—
Georg Schönberger	Waffen-SS	SS-Obersturmbannführer	Commander of SS-Panzer-Regiment 1 "Leibstandarte SS Adolf Hitler" (Note: According to Scherzer as commander of SS-Panzer-Regiment 1.)	20 December 1943*	Killed in action 20 November 1944	A man wearing a military uniform and side cap. His cap has an emblem in shape of a human skull and crossed bones.
Clemens Graf von Schönborn-Wiesentheid	Luftwaffe	Major	Geschwaderkommodore of Sturzkampfgeschwader 77	21 July 1940	—	
Wilhelm Prinz von Schönburg-Waldenburg	Heer	Hauptmann	Chief of the 1./Panzer-Regiment 31	18 May 1941	—	—
Heinrich Schönbusch	Heer	Feldwebel	Zugführer (platoon leader) in the 1./Pionier-Bataillon 1059	18 January 1945	—	—
Hans-Wolfgang Schöne	Heer	Oberleutnant of the Reserves	Leader of the II./Fahnenjunker-Grenadier-Regiment 1242 (Note: According to Scherzer as leader of the II./Grenadier-Regiment 1242.)	23 March 1945	—	—
Hans Schönebeck	Heer	Hauptmann	Leader of the I./Panzergrenadier-Regiment 64	23 March 1945	—	—
Dietrich Schöneboom	Kriegsmarine	Oberleutnant zur See	Commander of U-431	20 October 1943	—	—
Hans Schöneich	Heer	Oberstleutnant im Generalstab (in the General Staff)	Ia (operations officer) in the 20. Panzer-Division	12 August 1944	—	—
Rudolf Schoenert+	Luftwaffe	Oberleutnant of the Reserves	Staffelkapitän of the 4./Nachtjagdgeschwader 2	25 July 1942	Awarded 450th Oak Leaves 11 April 1944	—
Carl-August von Schönfeld	Heer	Oberst	Commander of Grenadier-Regiment 949	4 May 1944	—	—
Gerhard Schönfeld	Heer	Oberleutnant	Leader of the 3./Panzer-Pionier-Bataillon 40	25 August 1942	—	—
Henning Schönfeld	Heer	Oberstleutnant	Commander of Aufklärungs-Abteilung 20 (motorized)	15 August 1940	—	—
Kurt Schönfeld	Heer	Oberfeldwebel	Zugführer (platoon leader) in the 4./Panzer-Regiment 10	22 September 1941	—	—
Helmut Schönfelder	Luftwaffe	Oberfeldwebel	Pilot in the Stabstaffel/Jagdgeschwader 51 "Mölders"	31 March 1945	—	—
Manfred Schönfelder	Waffen-SS	SS-Obersturmbannführer	Ia (operations officer) of the 5. SS-Panzer-Division "Wiking"	23 February 1944	—	A man in semi profile wearing a military uniform and neck order, in the shape of a cross. His hair is combed to the back.
Wilhelm Schöning+	Heer	Major of the Reserves	Commander of the I./Füsilier-Regiment "Feldherrnhalle"	7 February 1944	Awarded 707th Oak Leaves 21 January 1945	—
Wolfram Schönwald	Heer	Oberleutnant of the Reserves	Leader of the II./Grenadier-Regiment 53	10 September 1944	—	—
Gerhard Schöpfel	Luftwaffe	Hauptmann	Gruppenkommandeur of the III./Jagdgeschwader 26 "Schlageter"	11 September 1940	—	
Eberhard Schoepffer	Heer	Oberst	Combat commander of Elbing	9 February 1945	—	—
Ferdinand Schörner+	Heer	Generalmajor	Commander of the 6. Gebirgs-Division	20 April 1941	Awarded 398th Oak Leaves 17 February 1944; 93rd Swords 28 August 1944; 23rd Diamonds 1 January 1945	A man wearing a military uniform with an Iron Cross displayed at the front of his uniform collar.
Heinz Schoknecht	Heer	Leutnant of the Reserves	Zugführer (platoon leader) in schwere Heeres-Panzer-Jäger-Abteilung 666	21 January 1945	—	—
Heinrich Schollen	Heer	Feldwebel	Zugführer (platoon leader) in the 2./Panzergrenadier-Regiment 14	12 November 1943	—	—
Klaus Scholtz+	Kriegsmarine	Kapitänleutnant	Commander of U-108	26 December 1941	Awarded 123rd Oak Leaves 10 September 1942	—
Erich Scholz	Heer	Generalmajor	Commander of Kampfgruppe "Scholz" (Note: According to Scherzer as Höherer Artilleriekommandeur 314 and commander of Kampfgruppe "Scholz".)	26 December 1944	—	—
Fritz von Scholz Edler von Rarancze+	Waffen-SS	SS-Oberführer	Commander of SS-Regiment "Nordland"	18 January 1942	Awarded 423rd Oak Leaves 12 March 1944; 85th Swords 8 August 1944	—
Fritz Scholz	Heer	Major	Commander of the I./Grenadier-Regiment 423	21 January 1945	—	—
Gerhard Scholz	Heer	Oberfeldwebel	Leader of the 7./Grenadier-Regiment 317	21 September 1944	—	—
Helmut Scholz+	Waffen-SS	SS-Untersturmführer	Leader of the 7./SS-Freiwilligen-Panzergrenadier-Regiment 49 "De Ruyter" (Note: According to Scherzer as leader of the 7./SS-Freiwilligen-Panzergrenadier-Regiment 49 "De Ruiter" (niederl. Nr. 2).)	4 June 1944	Awarded 591st Oak Leaves 21 September 1944	—
Karl Scholz? (Note: Karl Scholz's nomination was received by the Heerespersonalamt (HPA—Army Staff Office) on 19 April 1945. There is no file card in the German Federal Archives. The book of "Verliehene Ritterkreuze" (Awarded Knight Crosses) contains his entry under Nr. 5144 which was approved by Major Joachim Domaschk on 28 April 1945. He is listed in the files for rejected or unfinished nominations. According to the Association of Knight's Cross Recipients (AKCR) the award was presented in accordance with the Dönitz-decree. This is illegal according to the Deutsche Dienststelle (WASt) and lacks legal justification. The presentation date was assigned by Walther-Peer Fellgiebel. Scholz was a member of the AKCR.)	Heer	Leutnant of the Reserves	Leader of the 14./Grenadier-Regiment 4	9 May 1945	—	—
Siegfried Scholz	Luftwaffe	Hauptmann	Staffelkapitän of the 1./Kampfgeschwader 100	24 March 1943	—	—
Dr.-Ing. Werner Scholz	Heer	Leutnant of the Reserves	Zugführer (platoon leader) in the 2./Sturmgeschütz-Brigade 279	5 March 1945	—	—
Georg Scholze	Heer	Oberst	Commander of Infanterie-Lehr-Regiment (Note: According to Scherzer as commander of Lehr-Regiment (motorized) 901.)	17 February 1943	—	A man wearing a peaked cap and military uniform with an Iron Cross displayed at the front of his uniform collar.
Karl-Heinz Schomann	Luftwaffe	Major	Gruppenkommandeur of the I.(K)/Lehrgeschwader 1	29 October 1943	—	—
Heinrich Schonder	Kriegsmarine	Kapitänleutnant	Commander of U-77	19 August 1942	—	—
Erich Schopper	Heer	Generalleutnant	Commander of the 81. Infanterie-Division	30 April 1943	—	—
Wilhelm Schormann	Heer	Obergefreiter	Group leader in the 1./Panzergrenadier-Regiment 74	18 November 1944*	Killed in action 16 October 1944	—
Reinhard Schoßleitner	Luftwaffe	Leutnant	Staffelführer of the 8./Kampfgeschwader 6	5 February 1944*	Killed in action 10 October 1943	—
Albert Schott	Heer	Unteroffizier	Zugführer (platoon leader) in the 1./Grenadier-Regiment 1077	10 September 1944	—	—
Hermann Schrader	Heer	Hauptmann	Leader of Divisions-Füsilier-Bataillon 49	9 December 1944	—	—
Hermann-Albert Schrader	Heer	Oberleutnant	Chief of the 11./Infanterie-Regiment 16	29 May 1940	—	—
Dr. jur. Oskar Schrader	Luftwaffe	Oberstleutnant	Commander of Flak-Regiment 104	8 September 1942	—	—
Otto von Schrader	Kriegsmarine	Admiral	Kommadierender Admiral norwegische Westküste—Commanding Admiral of the Norwegian west coast	19 August 1943	—	—
Werner Schrader	Heer	Leutnant	Leader of the 3./Grenadier-Regiment 17	24 December 1944	—	—
Herbert Schramm+	Luftwaffe	Leutnant	Pilot in the III./Jagdgeschwader 53	6 August 1941	Awarded 736th Oak Leaves 11 February 1945	—
Richard Schramm	Heer	Oberwachtmeister	Zugführer (platoon leader) in the 1./Sturmgeschütz-Abteilung 202	23 December 1942	—	—
Max-Günther Schrank	Heer	Oberstleutnant	Commander of the I./Gebirgsjäger-Regiment 100	17 July 1941	—	—
Werner Schrauth	Heer	Oberleutnant	Leader of the 1./Grenadier-Regiment 80	3 December 1943*	Killed in action 14 September 1943	—
Fritz Schreckenbach	Heer	Oberfeldwebel	Zugführer (platoon leader) in the 4./Panzer-Aufklärungs-Abteilung 5	5 September 1944	—	—
Alfred Schreiber	Heer	Oberfeldwebel	Zugführer (platoon leader) in the 6./Grenadier-Regiment 365	20 April 1943	—	—
Franz Schreiber	Waffen-SS	SS-Standartenführer	Commander of SS-Gebirgsjäger-Regiment 12 "Michael Gaißmair"	26 December 1944	—	—
Gustav Schreiber	Waffen-SS	SS-Hauptscharführer	Deputy leader of the 7./SS-Panzergrenadier-Regiment 9 "Germania" (Note: According to Scherzer as leader of the 7./SS-Panzergrenadier-Regiment "Germania".)	2 December 1943	—	A man wearing a peaked cap with skull emblem, a military uniform with various military decorations and an Iron Cross displayed at the front of his uniform collar.
Hans-Jürgen Schreiber	Heer	Oberleutnant	Chief of the 4./Divisions-Aufklärungs-Abteilung 22	3 January 1943	—	—
Helmuth Schreiber	Waffen-SS	SS-Hauptsturmführer	Chief of the 10./SS-Panzergrenadier-Regiment "Deutschland"	30 July 1943	—	—
Josef Schreiber+	Heer	Feldwebel	Zugführer (platoon leader) in the 4./Sturm-Regiment 14	31 March 1943	Awarded 309th Oak Leaves 5 October 1943	—
Kurt Schreiber	Luftwaffe	Hauptmann	Commander of the II./Grenadier-Regiment 1 "Hermann Göring"	21 June 1943	—	—
Dr. iur. Hellmuth Schreiber-Volkening	Heer	Oberleutnant	Chief of the 9./Infanterie-Regiment 16	29 May 1940	—	A man wearing a military uniform with an Iron Cross displayed at the front of his uniform collar.
Leopold Schrems	Heer	Obergefreiter	Group leader in the Stabskompanie/Gebirgsjäger-Regiment 85	27 July 1944	—	—
Karl Schrepfer+	Luftwaffe	Oberleutnant	Staffelkapitän of the 6./Sturzkampfgeschwader 1	19 June 1942	Awarded (850th) Oak Leaves 28 April 1945	—
Martin Schriefer	Heer	Oberstleutnant	Commander of Grenadier-Regiment 168	24 June 1944	—	—
Remi Schrijnen	Waffen-SS	SS-Sturmmann	Richtschütze (gunner) in the 2./SS-Freiwilligen-Sturmbrigade 6 "Langemarck" (Note: According to Scherzer as Richtschütze (gunner) in the 2./6. SS-Freiwilligen-Sturmbrigade "Langemarck".)	21 September 1944	—	—
Albert Schroeder	Heer	Hauptmann (Note: According to Scherzer as Hauptmann of the Reserves.)	Chief of the 3./Heeres-Flak-Artillerie-Abteilung 287	9 December 1944	—	—
Ferdinand Schroeder	Heer	Oberleutnant (Note: According to Scherzer as Oberleutnant of the Reserves.)	Chief of the 5./Grenadier-Regiment 1124	17 March 1945	—	—
Hans-Erwin Schröder	Heer	Unteroffizier	Gun leader in the 1./Panzer-Jäger-Abteilung 20	4 December 1941	—	—
Heinz Schröder	Heer	Oberleutnant	Chief of the 4./Artillerie-Regiment 260	4 November 1943	—	—
Dr.-Ing. Kurt Schröder	Heer	Oberstleutnant	Commander of Pionier-Bataillon 74	19 February 1942	—	—
Wilhelm Schröder+	Heer	Oberstleutnant	Commander of Grenadier-Regiment 580	26 March 1944	Awarded 779th Oak Leaves 13 March 1945	—
[Dr.] Erich Schroedter+	Heer	Rittmeister	Commander of Panzer-Aufklärungs-Abteilung "Großdeutschland"	23 October 1944	Awarded 808th Oak Leaves 28 March 1945	—
Michael Schroepfer	Heer	Obergefreiter	Richtschütze (gunner) in the 14./Infanterie-Regiment 111	27 December 1941	—	—
Werner Schröer+	Luftwaffe	Leutnant	Staffelführer of the 8./Jagdgeschwader 27	20 October 1942	Awarded 268th Oak Leaves 2 August 1943 (144th) Swords 19 April 1945 (Note: According to Scherzer Swords on 16 April 1945.)	—
[Dr.] Heinrich Schroeteler	Kriegsmarine	Kapitänleutnant	Commander of U-1023	2 May 1945	—	—
Anton Schroeter	Heer	Oberleutnant	Leader of Divisions-Füsilier-Bataillon 126	26 March 1944	—	—
Erich Schröter	Heer	Hauptmann	Commander of the I./Infanterie-Regiment 120 (motorized)	8 September 1941	—	—
Fritz Schröter	Luftwaffe	Oberleutnant	Staffelkapitän of the 10./Jagdgeschwader 2 "Richthofen" (Note: According to Scherzer as Staffelkapitän of the 10.(Jabo)/Jagdgeschwader 2 "Richthofen".)	24 September 1942	—	A man wearing a military uniform with an Iron Cross displayed at the front of his uniform collar.
Horst von Schroeter	Kriegsmarine	Oberleutnant zur See	Commander of U-123	1 June 1944	—	—
Walther Schroth	Heer	General der Infanterie	Commanding general of the XII. Armeekorps	9 July 1941	—	—
Ernst Schrupp	Heer	Hauptmann (Note: According to Scherzer as Hauptmann of the Reserves.)	Leader of the 3./Artillerie-Regiment 1176	28 March 1945	—	—
