= Adolf Wolf =

German military officer in World War II

- Born: 23 May 1899; Braunschweig, German Empire
- Died: 11 March 1973 (aged 73); Bayreuth, West Germany
- Military career
- Allegiance: Nazi Germany
- Branch: Luftwaffe
- Rank: Generalmajor
- Commands: 18. Flak-Division; 13. Flak-Division
- Conflicts: World War I World War II
- Awards: Knight's Cross of the Iron Cross

Adolf Wolf (23 May 1899 – 11 March 1973) was a general in the Luftwaffe during World War II who commanded the 13th Flak Division.

He was a recipient of the Knight's Cross of the Iron Cross.

== Awards and decorations ==
- Knight's Cross of the Iron Cross on 20 June 1940 as Oberstleutnant and commander of I./Flak-Regiment 64 (mot.)

Military offices
Preceded by Generalleutnant Prinz Heinrich Reuss	Commander of 18th Flak Division; 1 February 1944 – 2 October 1944	Succeeded by Generalmajor Günther Sachs
Preceded by Generalmajor Max Schaller	Commander of 13th Flak Division; 2 October 1944 – 8 May 1945	Succeeded by None
