= Richard Schimpf =

WW2 German general (1897-1972)

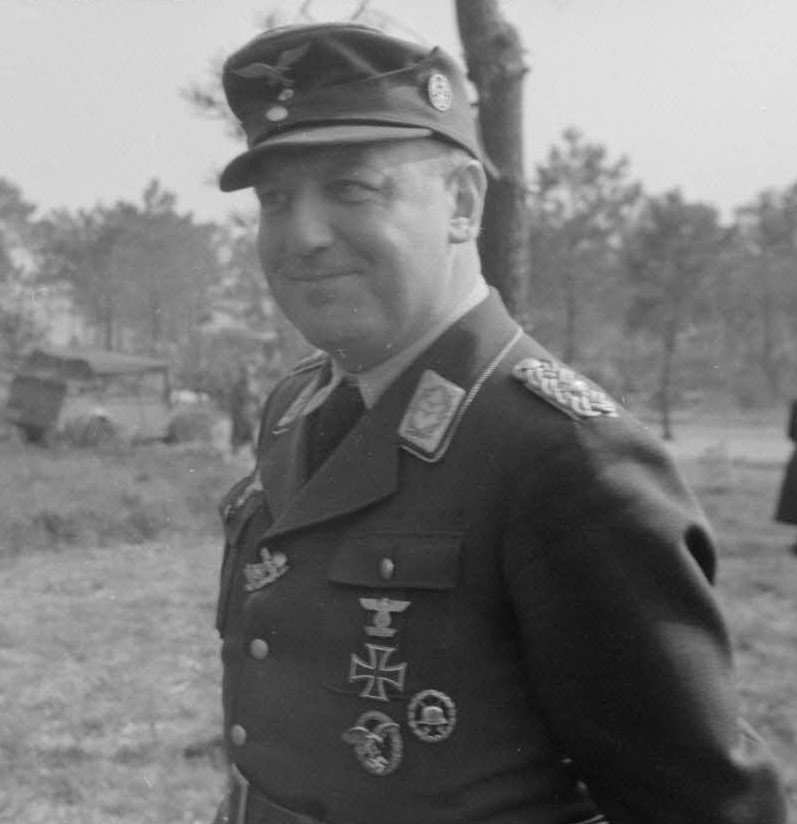
- Schimpf during an inspection of the 3rd Parachute Division in Finistère, France (1944)
- Born: 16 May 1897
- Died: 30 December 1972 (aged 75)
- Military career
- Allegiance: Nazi Germany; West Germany
- Branch: Luftwaffe; German Air Force
- Rank: Generalleutnant (Wehrmacht); Generalmajor (Bundeswehr)
- Commands: 21st Luftwaffe Field Division; 3rd Parachute Division
- Conflicts: World War II
- Awards: Knight's Cross of the Iron Cross

Richard Schimpf (16 May 1897 – 30 December 1972) was a paratroop general in the Luftwaffe of Nazi Germany during World War II. He was a recipient of the Knight's Cross of the Iron Cross. On 8 March 1945, he negotiated a surrender to American troops at Bad Godesberg, handing himself and the city over without a shot being fired. He joined the post war West German Air Force in 1957 and retired in 1962 as a Generalmajor.

== Awards and decorations ==
- Clasp to the Iron Cross (1939) 2nd Class (5 August 1940) & 1st Class (17 February 1941)
- Knight's Cross of the Iron Cross on 6 October 1944 as Generalleutnant and commander of 3. Fallschirmjäger Division
- Order of Merit of the Federal Republic of Germany

Military offices
| Preceded by Formed from Luftwaffen-Division Meindl | Commander of 21. Luftwaffen-Feld-Division; December 1942 – 24 October 1943 | Succeeded by Generalleutnant Rudolf-Eduard Licht |
| Preceded by Generalmajor Walter Barenthin | Commander of 3. Fallschirmjäger Division; 17 February 1944 – 20 August 1944 | Succeeded by Generalmajor Walter Wadehn |
| Preceded by Generalmajor Walter Wadehn | Commander of 3. Fallschirmjäger Division; 6 January 1945 – 1 March 1945 | Succeeded by Oberst Helmut von Hoffmann |
