= Günther Sachs =

- Born: 4 May 1903; Springe
- Died: 15 July 1962 (aged 59)
- Military career
- Allegiance: Nazi Germany
- Branch: Luftwaffe
- Rank: Generalleutnant
- Commands: 18th Flak Division
- Conflicts: World War II
- Awards: Knight's Cross of the Iron Cross

Günther Sachs (4 May 1903 – 15 July 1962) was a general in the Luftwaffe of Nazi Germany during World War II who commanded the 18th Flak Division. He was a recipient of the Knight's Cross of the Iron Cross.

== Awards and decorations ==
- German Cross in Gold on 3 January 1944 as Oberst im Generalstab in the I. Luftwaffen-Feld-Korps
- Knight's Cross of the Iron Cross on 24 January 1945 as Generalmajor and commander of 18. Flak-Division

Military offices
Preceded by Generalmajor Adolf Wolf	Commander of 18th Flak Division; 2 October 1944 – 8 May 1945	Succeeded by None
