= Gottfried Schädlich =

German writer and military officer

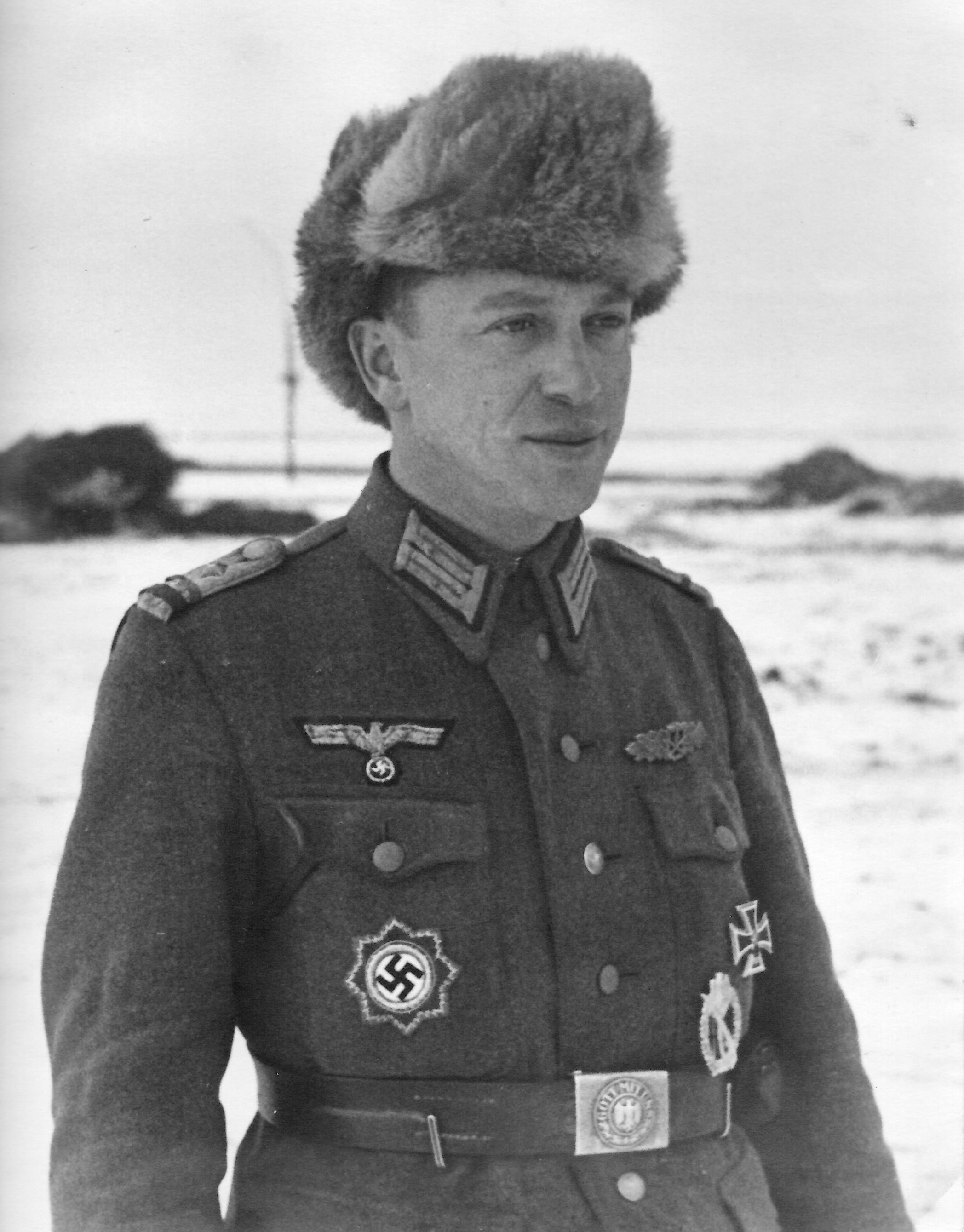
- Schädlich in Zaporizhzhia, 13 January 1944
- Born: 20 March 1917; Kirchberg, Saxony, German Empire
- Died: 12 May 2007 (aged 90); Brühl, North Rhine-Westphalia, Germany
- Resting place: Erftstadt-Liblar Cemetery, North Rhine-Westphalia, Germany
- Occupations: Writer, military officer
- Writing career
- Pen name: Fried Noxius, G. F. W. Suixon
- Genres: Novels, military strategy
- Notable awards: German Cross in gold, Knight's Cross of the Iron Cross

Gottfried Schädlich (pseudonyms: Fried Noxius and G. F. W. Suixon; 20 March 1917 – 12 May 2007) was a German Oberstleutnant and writer.

== Biography ==
After graduating from the Fürstenschule Grimma, Schädlich worked for the Reich Labour Service in Emsland for a few months until September 1937. In the same year in October, he joined the army of the Wehrmacht as a rifleman. Early in World War II, he was initially assigned as a platoon leader and adjutant in the 1st Battalion of the 514th Grenadier Regiment of the 294th Infantry Division. In late fall 1942, as a Oberleutnant, he commanded a rifle company and a German-Romanian combat group. Later in the war, Schädlich was as a Hauptmann and Major commander of the 1st Battalion of the 514th Grenadier Regiment and was awarded the German Cross in gold on January 13, 1944, and the Knight's Cross of the Iron Cross on July 9, 1944. Shortly thereafter, in August 1944, the 294th Infantry Division was destroyed near Kishinev during the Red Army's second Jassy–Kishinev offensive. From September 1944 to December 1949 he was a Soviet prisoner of war in the camps of Gryazovets, Cherepovets, and Mikhailovo. There he worked as a logger, lumberjack, mower and carpenter.

After his return to the Germany, he first worked as a customs officer in Aachen. In 1956 he joined the newly founded Bundeswehr as a Major. There he first worked as a lecture hall leader and head of inspection at the Kampfftruppenschule II in Munster and the Heeresoffizierschule I in Hanover. In 1963 he was promoted to Oberstleutnant and in 1965, until he retired in 1973, he was assigned to the Heeresamt in Cologne as head of the group Divisionsvorschriften.

Schädlich published over 30 books, under his birth name a few military books and under his pseudonym "Fried Noxius" numerous books for children.

== Reception ==
According to a review in the Allgemeine Schweizerische Militaerzeitschrift, the Taschenbuch der Taktik (1963) published by E.S. Mittler & Sohn is considered to have "quite useful tips for the design of the tactical training". About Das Trojanische Pferd (1965) it said: "As a collection of ideas, the volume can be recommended to every trainer from group leader to battalion commander."

== Awards ==
- (Nazi Germany) Close Combat Clasp in bronze (12/12/1941)
- (Nazi Germany) Infantry Assault Badge in silver (9/25/1943)
- (Nazi Germany) Wehrmacht Long Service Award 4th class (1941)
- (Nazi Germany) Eastern Medal (8/20/1942)
- (Nazi Germany) Iron Cross 2nd class (9/4/1941)
- (Nazi Germany) Iron Cross 1st class (4/8/1942)
- (Nazi Germany) German Cross in gold (1/13/1944)
- (Nazi Germany) Knight's Cross of the Iron Cross (7/9/1944)
- (Bulgaria) Royal Bulgarian Order of Bravery IV grade, 2nd class (6/30/1942)
- (Germany) Verdienstkreuz am Bande (2/22/1973)

== Works ==
=== Military books ===
- Kurzgefasstes Lehrbuch für den Reserveoffizier und (Res.-)Offz.-Anwärter
  - Einführung und allgemeine Schulung (1960)
  - Taktische Schulung (1960)
- Taschenbuch der Taktik
  - Taktische Grundsätze (1963)
  - Die Kampfarten und Entschlussaufgaben (1963)
- Das Trojanische Pferd: Kriegslist – gestern und heute (1965)
  - Kriegslist: gestern und heute (1979)

=== Children and Youth books ===
- 30 Gutenachtmärchen (1953)
- Der grosse Ring (1957)
- Der verlorene Schatten (1959)
- Freiheit für Jacki (1961)
- Der Geschichtenpeter: Viele kunterbunte Kindergeschichten (1963)
- Der Geisterpfad: 11 Abenteuer- und Detektivgeschichten (1966)
- Gute-Nacht-Geschichten für kleine Leute (1967)
- Kennwort Schwarzer Brummer (1968)
- Die Zwiebelprinzessin: Geschichten für Kinder (1968)
- Herr Plum und der Papagei: Spannende Geschichten für Kinder (1969)
- Der Riese Nimmersatt und andere Geschichten: 15 Geschichten aus der Märchenwelt zum Vorlesen und Selberlesen (1969)
- Giraffe mit Knoten: Geschichten aus aller Welt für Kinder (1970)
- Aktion Hilfe für Oliver (1970, ISBN 3-7942-0118-3)
- Spuk im Lindenhof: Spannende Abenteuer (1970, ISBN 3-442-20003-2)
- Ein Ball rollt auf die Strasse: spannende Geschichten zur Verkehrserziehung (1972, ISBN 3-442-20043-1)
- Der verkaufte Regenbogen: schnurriges Märchenallerlei (1972, ISBN 3-442-20047-4)
- Der Geschichtenpeter: bunte Sachen zum Lesen und Lachen (1972)
- Gefährliches Geheimnis: Rätsel um einen unterirdischen Gang (1973, ISBN 3-442-20070-9)
- Im Netz der Schmuggler (1974, ISBN 3-536-01121-7)
- Gefahr am Platz der Gaukler (1974, ISBN 3-473-39311-8)
- Der Trick des Herrn van Loo (1976, ISBN 3-473-39373-8)
- Jonathan und der Geistervogel (1977, ISBN 3-473-39394-0)
- Zwei Augen zuviel: Detektivgeschichten (1978, ISBN 3-88101-570-1)
- Jonathan und der goldene Krake (1979, ISBN 3-473-39578-1)
- Ein gefährlicher Vogel (1979, ISBN 3-88101-584-1)
- Ein falscher Zug und andere spannende Geschichten (1979, ISBN 3-88101-590-6)
- Kennwort Gelbe Schaukel: Geheimnisse, Abenteuer, Spannung (1980, ISBN 3-88101-618-X)
- Privatdetektiv Jonathan Jonathan
  - Die Spur führt nach Marokko (1980, ISBN 3-88101-611-2)
  - Die Geschäfte des Herrn van Loo (1981, ISBN 3-88101-611-2)
- Lasst euch den Mond nicht rauben (1986, ISBN 3-7709-0619-5)
- Wie der Winter ins Land kam: Weihnachts- und Wintergeschichten für Kinder (1991, ISBN 3-579-02174-5)
- Der Eisblumenstrauss: Schnee- und Eisgeschichten (1992, ISBN 3-579-01509-5)
