= Helmut Schönfelder =

German World War II fighter pilot

- Born: 30 April 1914; Nienburg an der Weser
- Died: 23 September 2003 (aged 89); Bad Schwalbach
- Military career
- Allegiance: Nazi Germany
- Branch: Luftwaffe
- Service years: ?-1945
- Rank: Oberfeldwebel
- Unit: JG 51
- Conflicts: World War II: Eastern Front
- Awards: Knight's Cross of the Iron Cross

Helmut Schönfelder (30 April 1914 – 23 September 2003) was a Luftwaffe ace and recipient of the Knight's Cross of the Iron Cross during World War II. The Knight's Cross of the Iron Cross, and its variants were the highest awards in the military and paramilitary forces of Nazi Germany during World War II. Schönfelder was credited with 56 aerial victories.

== Career ==
Schönfelder was born on 30 April 1914 in Nienburg an der Weser in the Province of Hanover within the German Empire.

=== With the Stabsstaffel ===
In early October 1942, II. Gruppe of JG 51 was withdrawn from the Eastern Front and sent to Jesau, near present-day Bagrationovsk, to Heiligenbeil, present-day Mamonovo, to be reequipped with the Focke-Wulf Fw 190 A. While undergoing training on this aircraft, the Gruppe received orders on 4 November to transfer to the Mediterranean theatre flying the Bf 109 again. 6. Staffel was exempt from this order, was detached from II. Gruppe, and continued its training on the Fw 190. In late November, 6. Staffel was renamed to Stabsstaffel (headquarters squadron) of JG 51 and placed under the command of Diethelm von Eichel-Streiber on 30 November. Alternatively, the Stabsstaffel was also referred to as Geschwaderstabsstaffel z.b.V., roughly translating to fighter wing squadron for special deployment'. The abbreviation z. b. V. is German and stands for zur besonderen Verwendung (for special deployment).

A training mission flown on 6 June 1944, resulted in forced landing at Biała Podlaska of his Focke-Wulf Fw 190 A due to engine failure. On 31 March 1945, Schönfelder was awarded the Knight's Cross of the Iron Cross (Ritterkreuz des Eisernen Kreuzes).

== Summary of career ==
=== Aerial victory claims ===
According to US historian David T. Zabecki, Schönfelder was credited with 56 aerial victories. Mathews and Foreman, authors of Luftwaffe Aces – Biographies and Victory Claims, researched the German Federal Archives and state that he claimed 56 aerial victories, all of which on the Eastern Front.

Chronicle of aerial victories
This and the – (dash) indicates unconfirmed aerial victory claims for which Schönfelder did not receive credit. This and the ? (question mark) indicates information discrepancies listed by Prien, Stemmer, Rodeike, Balke, Bock, Mathews and Foreman.
Claim	Date	Time	Type	Location	Claim	Date	Time	Type	Location
– 6. Staffel of Jagdgeschwader 51 – Operation Barbarossa — October – 5 December 1941
1	27 October 1941	14:15	DB-3	15 km (9.3 mi) northeast of Mtsensk	2	28 November 1941	11:10	I-16	3 km (1.9 mi) southeast of Kashira
– 6. Staffel of Jagdgeschwader 51 – Eastern Front — 6 December 1941 – 30 April 1942
3	13 January 1942	14:49	I-16	southwest of Yukhnov	6	7 March 1942	08:07	I-61? (Note: According to Mathews and Foreman claimed as a Polikarpov I-16 fighter.)	30 km (19 mi) northeast of Krassilina
4	13 January 1942	14:52	I-16	45 km (28 mi) southwest of Yukhnov	7	8 March 1942	09:50	Pe-2	1 km (0.62 mi) north of Meshchovsk
5	7 March 1942	08:05	I-61?	30 km (19 mi) northeast of Krassilina					
– 6. Staffel of Jagdgeschwader 51 – Eastern Front — 1 May – 7 October 1942
8	1 May 1942	06:35	MiG-3	15 km (9.3 mi) northeast of Mtsensk	10	26 September 1942	15:12	LaGG-3	15 km (9.3 mi) north of Rzhev
9	25 August 1942	10:28	LaGG-3	12 km (7.5 mi) west of Belyov					
– Stabsstaffel of Jagdgeschwader 51 – Eastern Front — October – 31 December 1943
11	3 October 1943	16:35	MiG-3	163 km (101 mi) north-northeast of Yelsk	13	28 October 1943	14:56	Boston	22 km (14 mi) west-northwest of Loyew
12	23 October 1943	13:20	LaGG-3	42 km (26 mi) northeast of Orsha					
– Stabsstaffel of Jagdgeschwader 51 – Eastern Front — 1 January – 31 December 1944
14	10 January 1944	13:02	Yak-9	PQ 25 Ost 93536, 13 km (8.1 mi) east of Azarychy; 30 km (19 mi) south of Parychy	29	4 August 1944	08:05	Yak-9	PQ 25 Ost 36614, 27 km (17 mi) east-northeast of Raseiniai
— (Note: This unconfirmed claim is not listed by Mathews and Foreman.)	10 January 1944	—	Yak-9		30	4 August 1944	11:40	La-5	PQ 25 Ost498, 12 km (7.5 mi) south-southwest of Vilkaviškis
15	23 June 1944	09:40	LaGG-3	PQ 25 Ost 96823, 31 km (19 mi) north-northeast of Orsha; 55 km (34 mi) west-northwest of Maklok	31	4 August 1944	12:15	Yak-9	PQ 25 Ost 25633, 18 km (11 mi) south-southwest of Vilkaviškis
16	23 June 1944	16:58	P-39	PQ 25 Ost 96548, 24 km (15 mi) southeast of Ulla	32	5 August 1944	12:15	La-5	PQ 25 Ost 35318, 5 km (3.1 mi) northeast of Vilkaviškis
17	24 June 1944	09:40? (Note: According to Mathews and Foreman claimed at 12:40.)	Yak-7	PQ 35 Ost 05442, 20 km (12 mi) northeast of Orsha; 30 km (19 mi) north of Gorki	33	10 September 1944	10:31	La-5	PQ 25 Ost 36159, 10 km (6.2 mi) south of Schaulen
18	24 June 1944	18:15	P-39	PQ 25 Ost 96852, 27 km (17 mi) west of Vitebsk; 20 km (12 mi) west of Kamary	34	14 September 1944	14:52	Yak-9	PQ 25 Ost 29197, 3 km (1.9 mi) north of Varnai
19	26 June 1944	14:45	Yak-9	PQ 35 Ost 05357, 18 km (11 mi) northwest of Orsha	35	16 September 1944	09:50	Yak-9	PQ 25 Ost 27543, 16 km (9.9 mi) northwest of Moschaiken
20	8 July 1944	08:40	La-5	PQ 25 Ost 62123, 25 km (16 mi) southeast of Baranowitschi; 25 km (16 mi) north of Kursk	36	18 September 1944	17:21	Yak-7	PQ 25 Ost 26118, 12 km (7.5 mi) southwest of Telsche
21	16 July 1944	07:12	Yak-9	PQ 25 Ost 41369	37	1 October 1944	09:36	Pe-2	PQ 25 Ost 16326, 5 km (3.1 mi) northwest of Vainode
22	20 July 1944	07:40	Yak-9	PQ 25 Ost 32836, 5 km (3.1 mi) southwest of Ljuboml	38	10 October 1944	09:52	P-39	PQ 25 Ost 16328, 9 km (5.6 mi) southeast of Memel
23	22 July 1944	12:32	Pe-2	PQ 25 Ost 32872, 10 km (6.2 mi) southeast of Chełm	39	10 October 1944	11:24	Yak-9	PQ 25 Ost 16334, 13 km (8.1 mi) east of Memel
24	22 July 1944	12:45	Yak-9	PQ 25 Ost 32737, 11 km (6.8 mi) west-northwest of Chełm	40	18 October 1944	16:20	Yak-9	PQ 25 Ost 25284, 12 km (7.5 mi) east-northeast of Schlossberg
25	22 July 1944	12:48	Yak-9	PQ 25 Ost 32731, 13 km (8.1 mi) northwest of Chełm	41	26 October 1944	14:37	Pe-2	PQ 25 Ost 25581, 23 km (14 mi) east-northeast of Gołdap
26	26 July 1944	10:58	La-5	PQ 25 Ost 24764, 12 km (7.5 mi) east of Byalistok	42? (Note: This claim is not listed by Mathews and Foreman.)	27 December 1944	12:54	Yak-9	9 km (5.6 mi) northwest of Dobeln
27	30 July 1944	10:35	La-5	PQ 25 Ost 23734, 5 km (3.1 mi) east of Siedlce	43?	27 December 1944	13:08	Yak-9	8 km (5.0 mi) east of Tukums
28	2 August 1944	11:15	Pe-2	PQ 25 Ost 35371, 13 km (8.1 mi) south of Vilkaviškis					

=== Awards ===
- Iron Cross (1939) 2nd and 1st Class
- Honour Goblet of the Luftwaffe on 19 June 1944 as Oberfeldwebel and pilot
- German Cross in Gold on 1 January 1945 as Oberfeldwebel in the Stabstaffel/Jagdgeschwader 51
- Knight's Cross of the Iron Cross on 31 March 1945 as Oberfeldwebel and pilot in the Stabstaffel/Jagdgeschwader 51 "Mölders"
