= 3rd Parachute Division =

German WWII airborne division

- German: 3. Fallschirmjäger-Division
- Unit insignia
- Active: October 1943–April 1945
- Country: Germany
- Branch: Luftwaffe
- Type: Airborne forces
- Size: Division (15,976)
- Equipment: 930 MG-42, privates armed predominantly full auto light weapons
- Engagements: World War II; D-Day; Battle of Hürtgen Forest; Ruhr Pocket

Commanders
- Notable commanders: Richard Schimpf

The 3rd Parachute Division (German: 3. Fallschirmjäger-Division) was an airborne forces (Fallschirmjäger) division unit of Nazi Germany's Luftwaffe that was active during World War II. Its formation began in October 1943 in France near Reims. From February 1944 near Brest. In March 1944 division was reinforced by soldiers from the 3rd Battalion of the 1st Parachute Regiment.

== Operational history ==
The 3rd Parachute Division was an airborne forces division which fought during World War II. It was formed during 1943–44 around a cadre consisting of the veteran 3rd Battalion, 1st Parachute Regiment. The Division was well equipped with 930 MG42s. Each company had 20 MG 42s and 43 sub machine guns while a squad had 2 MG42s and 5 sub machine guns.

It arrived in Normandy on 10 June, by trucks after a night drive from Brittany. It was at full strength and consisted of young German volunteers, and numbered 15,976 soldiers and officers. Its level of training and excellent weapon systems prompted the commander of the US 29th Infantry Division to remark, "Those Germans are the best damned soldiers I ever saw. They're smart and they don't know what 'fear' means. They come in and they keep coming until they get their job done or you kill 'em."

The division went into combat in June 1944 in Normandy and inflicted heavy losses on the Allied forces opposing them. Nominally, the unit was to be motorised, but by June it still had no more than 40% of its authorised motor transport, even after seizing vehicles from French civilians. This was to have an impact when trying to move the division towards the invasion front.

Members of the 3rd Parachute Division were among the most politically indoctrinated of the German troops in the west, due to the Luftwaffe's and the airborne infantry's extensive use of National Socialist Guidance Officers for political education. German paratroopers, especially in the sectors of the 3rd Parachute Division, were particularly brutal in their repression of French civilian, and won a reputation as scavengers and looters, implementing, in the words of Pierre Monzat, the prefect of Finistère (Brittany), a 'veritable regime of terror'.

In August it was near virtually destroyed by mass aerial bombing in the area of Falaise. Formed again in Belgium from replacements from 22nd, 51st, 53rd Luftwaffe Field Regiments. During September 1944 it fought as a part of Kampfgruppe "Becker" in Arnhem area before participating in the Battle of Hürtgen Forest. It surrendered in April 1945 to American troops in Ruhr.

== Commanding officers ==
- Generalmajor Walter Barenthin, 13 September 1943 – 14 February 1944
- Generalleutnant Dipl.Ing. Richard Schimpf, 17 February 1944 – 20 August 1944
- General der Fallschirmtruppe Eugen Meindl (acting), 20 August 1944 – 22 August 1944
- Generalmajor Walter Wadehn, 22 August 1944 – 5 January 1945
- Generalleutnant Dipl.Ing. Richard Schimpf, 6 January 1945 – 1 March 1945
- Oberst Helmut von Hoffmann, 1 March 1945 – 8 March 1945
- Oberst Karl-Heinz Becker, 8 March 1945 – 8 April 1945
- Oberst Hummel, 8 April 1945 – 16 April 1945

== Organization in June 1944 ==
Commander: General Major Schimpf

- HQ Staff
  - 3rd Mortar Battalion
  - 3rd Anti-Tank Battalion
  - 3rd Artillery Battalion
  - 3rd Engineer Battalion
  - 3rd Signal Battalion
- 5th Fallschirmjäger Regiment
- 8th Fallschirmjäger Regiment
- 9th Fallschirmjäger Regiment
- Supply troops
