= Artur Schmitt =

German general and Knight's Cross recipient (1888–1972)

- Born: 20 July 1888; Albersweiler
- Died: 15 January 1972 (aged 83); Munich
- Military career
- Allegiance: German Empire: Kingdom of Bavaria (to 1918); Weimar Republic (1920–1933); Nazi Germany (1933–1945)
- Branch: Bavarian Army (1907–1912); German Imperial Schutztruppe (1912–1918); German Army (1937–1945)
- Service years: 1907–1920; 1935–1945
- Rank: Generalleutnant
- Commands: Rückwärtiges Armeegebiet 556
- Conflicts: World War I World War II: Battle of France; Operation Barbarossa; North African Campaign; Operation Crusader
- Awards: Knight's Cross of the Iron Cross
- Other work: Police officer

Artur Schmitt (20 July 1888 – 15 January 1972) was a highly decorated German soldier during World War I and World War II.

While serving as a General with the Afrikakorps during World War II, Schmitt was awarded the Ritterkreuz des Eisernen Kreuzes (Knight's Cross of the Iron Cross), which was awarded by Nazi Germany to recognise bravery or successful military leadership.

== Early life ==
Schmitt was born at Albersweiler in what was then the Bavarian Rhine District. He was educated at the Humanistische Gymnasium at Landau in der Pfalz.

In 1907 he joined the Bavarian Army, as an officer cadet with the Königlich Bayerisches 18. Infanterie-Regiment „Prinz Ludwig Ferdinand“ (German Wikipedia; "18th Royal Bavarian Infantry Regiment "Prince Louis Ferdinand"), in Landau and attended the Bayerische Kriegsakademie (Bavarian War Academy) in Munich. In 1912, Schmitt joined the Imperial Schutztruppe and was posted to the colony of German Southwest Africa (later Namibia).

== World War I ==
He took part in the South-West Africa campaign of World War I, during which he was captured.

After being transferred to a prisoner of war (POW) camp in Britain, Schmitt attempted to escape, without success. He was repatriated to Germany before the end of the war, and then joined Königlich Bayerisches Reserve-Infanterie-Regiment Nr. 1 (German Wikipedia), stationed in Munich.

== Inter-war years ==
In 1919 Schmitt joined a right-wing militia known as Freikorps Eulenburg, which fought against Russian forces during the Soviet Baltic offensive of 1918–1919 and put down an uprising by ethnic Poles in Upper Silesia.

Schmitt was employed by the Bavarian police from 1920 in Aschaffenburg and Munich.

Rejoining the army after the Nazis came to power, Schmitt served initially in the ordnance corps.

== World War II ==
By the outbreak of World War II, he was commander of Infanterie Regiment 626, part of 555. Infanterie-Division, on the Upper Rhine. From 19 June 1940, Schmitt was promoted to command 555 Division, which captured Strasbourg.

Schmitt commanded Oberfeldzeugstabs 2. in Poland and during the early stages of the invasion of the Soviet Union.

Promoted to Generalmajor in late 1941, Schmitt was posted to North Africa; under Erwin Rommel, Schmitt was initially the 556th Army Rear Area Commander for Panzergruppe Afrika. In November, he became the commander of the combined Axis Division “Bardia”, in the Sollum-Bardia sector.

In January 1942, following a prolonged offensive against Bardia by the South African 2nd Infantry Division and the New Zealand Divisional Cavalry Regiment, Schmitt was forced to surrender his forces to the South Africans, the first German general to do so in the Second World War. He became a prisoner of war. Following his capture, Schmitt was awarded the Knight's Cross of the Iron Cross (5 February 1942).

He was held in Canada until 1946, when he was transferred to Britain, but was not released until 1948.

== Later career ==
After the victory of Israeli forces in the war of 1948, the Arab League recruited Schmitt to train a pan-Arab army. While living in Cairo, he used the pseudonym/codename "Mr. Goldstein". Schmitt became disaffected with what he saw as machinations against him by some Egyptian generals, which he denounced in 1950, resigned and returned to Germany.

In 1966, Schmitt was a candidate for the far-right NPD in the Bavarian state parliament. His campaign material used controversial images of Schmitt in his Wehrmacht uniform (which featured swastikas on the cap badge and Knight's Cross). Schmitt criticised the use of the Knight's Cross in a 1967 film adaption of Gunther Grass's novel Katz und Maus ("Cat and Mouse"). The film had a high profile in Germany, due partly to it featuring acting performances by two sons of German Vice-Chancellor Willy Brandt.

== In popular culture ==
Schmitt was one of the subjects of a 2014 French documentary film Exil Nazi: La Promesse De L'Orient ("Nazi Exiles: The Promise of the Orient"), by the French-German filmmaker Géraldine Schwarz.

== Awards and decorations ==
- Iron Cross (1914)
  - 2nd Class
  - 1st Class
- Honour Cross of the World War 1914/1918
- Iron Cross (1939)
  - 2nd Class
  - 1st Class
- Knight's Cross of the Iron Cross on 5 February 1942.
