= Wehrmacht forces for the Ardennes Offensive =

German World War II force

The Wehrmacht forces for the Ardennes Offensive were the product of a German recruitment effort targeting German males between the ages of 16 and 60, to replace troops lost during the past five months of fighting the Western Allies on the Western Front. Although the Wehrmacht (German Armed Forces) was keeping the Allied forces contained along the Siegfried Line, the campaign had cost the Wehrmacht nearly 750,000 casualties, mostly irreplaceable. However, the rapid advance of the Allied armies in August and September 1944 after Operation Overlord had created a supply problem for the Allies. By October, the progress of the Western Allies' three army groups had slowed considerably, allowing the Germans to partly rebuild their strength and prepare for the defense of Germany itself. Adolf Hitler decided that the only way to reverse his fortunes would be to launch a counter-offensive on the Western Front, forcing both the United States and Great Britain to an early peace, and allowing the Wehrmacht to shift its forces to the Eastern Front, where it could defeat the much larger Soviet Red Army.

Hitler earmarked three field armies for the offensive: the 7th and the Fifth and Sixth Panzer. These accumulated over 240,000 soldiers, spread over seven panzer divisions, two panzer brigades and thirteen infantry divisions. The bulk of the offensive's armored strength was in the Sixth Panzer Army, which was tasked with the capture of the Belgian port of Antwerp. To its south was the Fifth Panzer Army, outfitted to protect the Sixth's flank while it crossed the Meuse river. The southernmost flank was covered by the Seventh Army, composed of three infantry corps and ordered to protect the Fifth Army's southern flank and tie down American reserves in Luxembourg.

Apart from these three armies the Wehrmacht also designed two special units to aid the offensive. One of these was a battalion-sized airborne formation tasked with dropping behind American lines during the first day of the offensive, allowing a panzer division from the Sixth Panzer Army easy access across the Meuse. The second unit was a panzer brigade, intending to go behind enemy lines dressed in American uniforms to give false orders and spread confusion among American defenders in the Ardennes. Also earmarked for the offensive were around 800 aircraft, deployed by the Luftwaffe (German Air Force), to provide air support to German forces and destroy much of the Allied air power on the ground.

To prepare these forces the Oberkommando der Wehrmacht (German High Command) increased the call-up age range and recruited from Eastern European countries controlled by German forces, increasing manpower on the Western Front from roughly 400,000 to just over one million soldiers. Hastily organized into new divisions, these infantrymen lacked training and sometimes even weapons. Despite an immense German effort in the face of intense Allied bombing to build the necessary stocks for the offensive, there were shortages of fuel, ammunition, weapons and manpower by the scheduled date of the counterattack. Even the elite Waffen-SS divisions were often deficient in manpower.

== Background ==
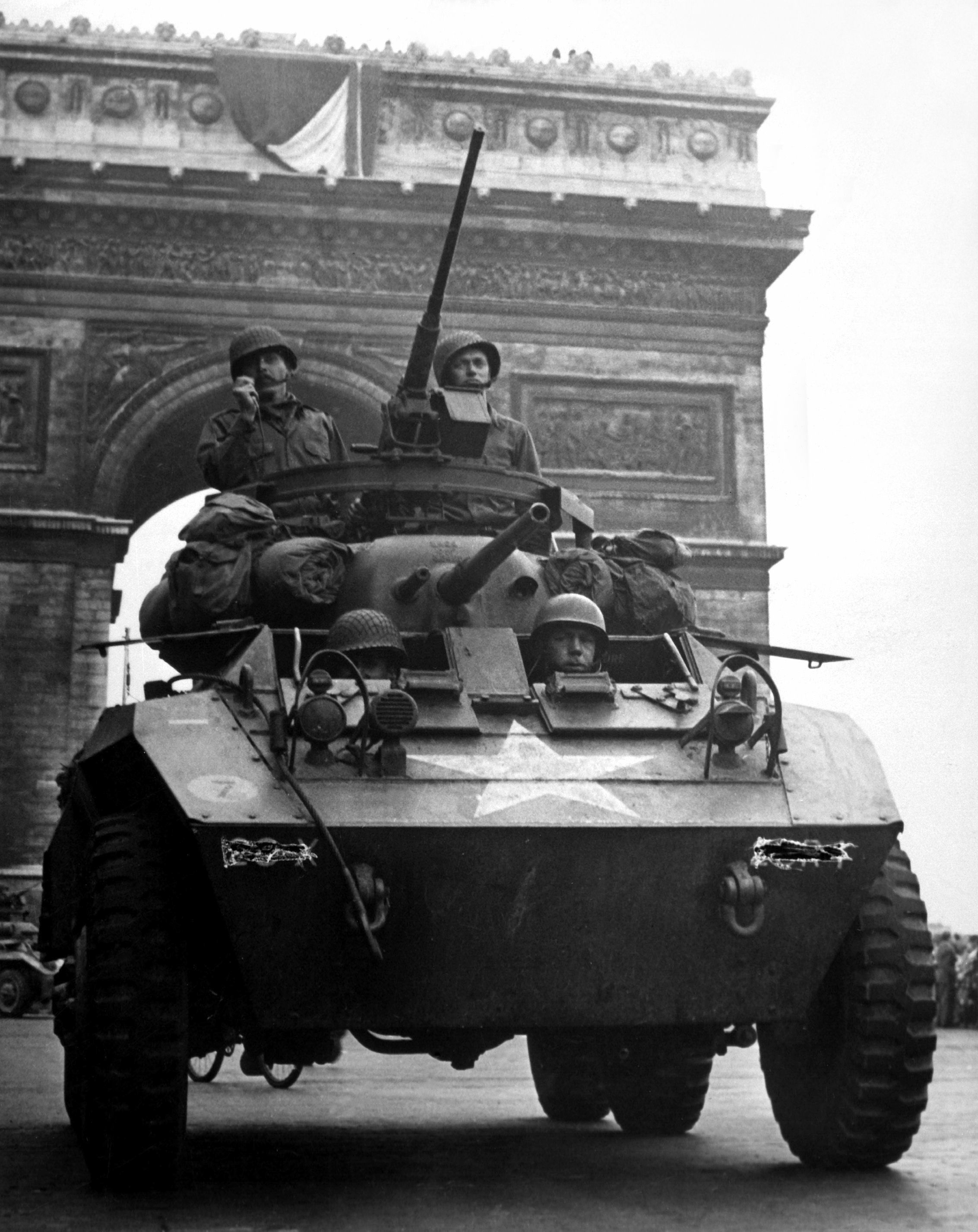
An American M8 armored scout car in front of the Arc de Triomphe at the "Liberation Day" parade in Paris.

By 1 December 1944, the only sector of the front where the Western Allies were not on the offensive was along the Ardennes. In late July 1944, Allied forces in fighting in Normandy were able to break out of the Normandy beachhead in Operation Cobra, forcing a general eastwards retreat of German forces. General Dwight D. Eisenhower, the Supreme Allied Commander on the Western Front, used the opportunity to encircle the German army in Normandy. In an effort to reverse their misfortunes, the Wehrmacht launched Operation Lüttich on 7 August in the vicinity of the town of Mortain. Despite efforts to break through the U.S. 30th Infantry Division to cut off Allied forces in Northern France, by 13 August it was clear that the offensive had failed. Even while battle was raging around Mortain, Allied armies continued the encirclement of the Wehrmacht in Normandy, closing what would be known as the Falaise Pocket on 20 August; the encirclement cost the Germans an estimated 10,000 dead and another 50,000 wounded. Although a much larger number of German soldiers were able to escape eastwards, they were forced to leave behind their heavy weapons and equipment. Paris was liberated on 25 August 1944, marking the end of Operation Overlord.

Almost immediately, the Allied drive across the Seine River continued, although the Wehrmacht was able to prevent a complete rout; according to the Germans, the equipment abandoned as they retreated from the Seine was as much of a disaster as the Falaise Pocket. Field Marshal Walter Model, who had temporarily replaced Gerd von Rundstedt as commander of German troops in France, reported that some panzer divisions only had five to ten operational tanks, while he could not match the Western Allies' mobility with his poorly outfitted infantry divisions. By early September, as the Allies pushed to the German border, Model calculated that the actual strength of the 74 divisions at his disposal was no more than that of 25. In an effort to stabilize German lines in the West, von Rundstedt was reappointed as Commander-in-Chief West on 7 September 1944. Approaching the Belgian border in early September the Allied offensive came to a grinding halt, as its supply lines struggled to keep up with the pace of the advance. For example, on 2 September, Lieutenant General George Patton's U.S. Third Army requested 2,840,000 liters (750,000 U.S. gal) of gasoline, and received 96,000 liters (25,000 U.S. gal).

The Wehrmacht began to reorganize itself along a defensive front known as the Siegfried Line. Eisenhower felt that he could relieve the supply problem by using Antwerp to unload supplies in Europe; however, German troops held the Scheldt estuary and consequently Allied shipping could not get through to the Belgian port city. In an effort to open the Scheldt estuary, Eisenhower approved Field Marshal Bernard Montgomery's Operation Market Garden, which was launched on 17 September. However, by 21 September the operation had failed to dislodge German defenders from the southern Netherlands and open the seaway to Antwerp; the supply problem was at its worst.

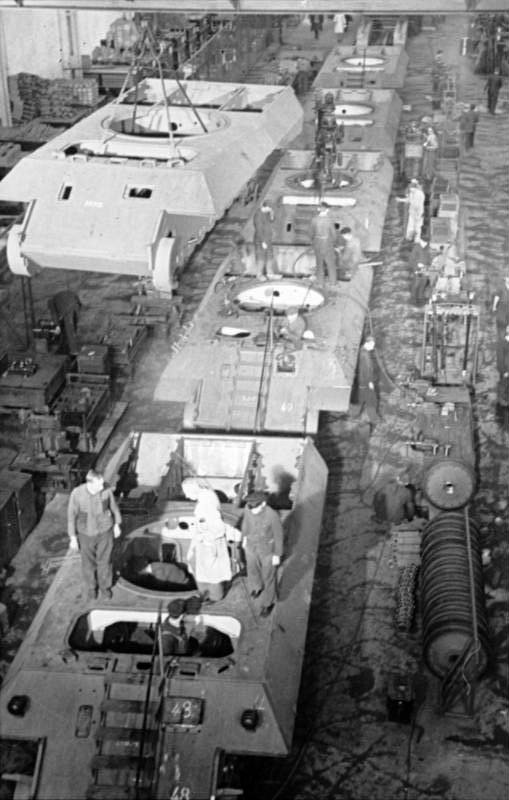
Despite an increase in weapons production in 1944, German industry had difficulty supplying German forces preparing for the Ardennes offensive.

Using the opportunity to rebuild their strength, the German Army in the West was able to accumulate a strength of around 500 tanks and assault guns by late September, despite prioritization of new equipment for the Eastern Front. This was in stark contrast to the estimated 100 which had been available before. German defenses along the Siegfried Line continued to strengthen, and the Wehrmacht was able to establish a defensive depth of an average of 4.8 kilometers (3.0 mi), with the strongest defenses built opposite of Patton's Third Army.

Despite Germany's reorganization, their manpower was still incomparable to that of the Western Allies. While Germany's Army Group B was able to increase their armored strength from 100 to 239 vehicles, these were opposed by 2,300 Allied tanks. Field Marshal Model reported that only 6,500 replacements had been sent to cover the 75,000 casualties suffered during the month of September. General Eisenhower commanded three army groups, totaling eight field armies with 55 divisions; these provided a two-to-one advantage in artillery guns and a twenty-to-one advantage in tanks, and could count on almost 14,000 combat aircraft, as compared to the Luftwaffe's 573.

=== Battles along the Siegfried Line ===
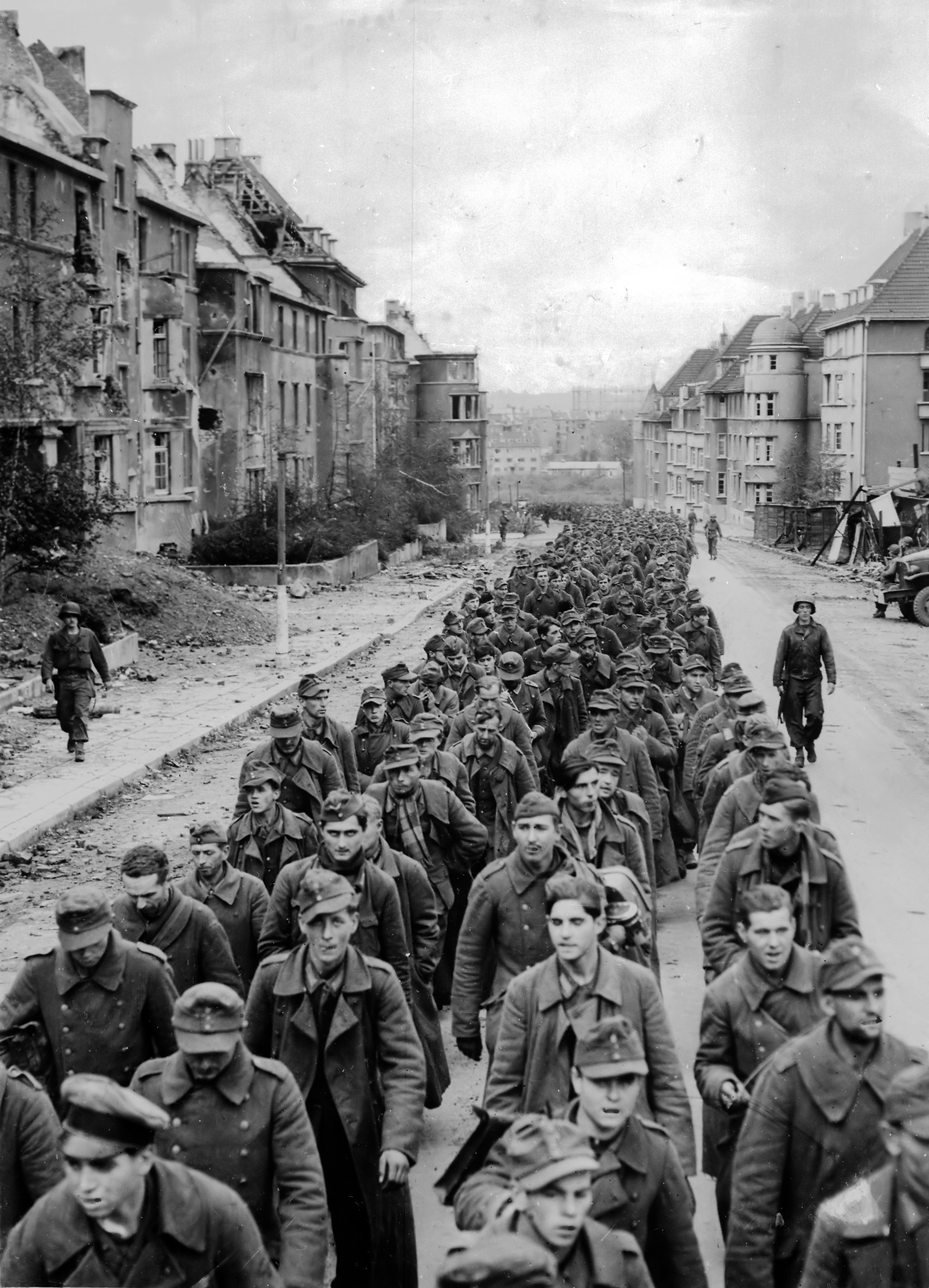
Procession of German prisoners captured after the fall of Aachen.

Patton's Third Army was tasked with the capture of Metz and the Lorraine; his first obstacle was Fort Driant, built in 1902 and improved over the years by both the French and the Germans. Expecting only a small garrison, the Third Army launched its attack on 27 September 1944. Despite heavy aerial and artillery bombardment, no appreciable damage was done to the giant fortress. Several ground attacks carried out between 27 September and 11 October failed in taking the fort, and ultimately General Patton was forced to call off the attack and look for another route to Metz. Fort Driant did not fall until after Patton had successfully taken Metz and the majority of forts around Driant. The Third Army's battle around Metz had cost an estimated 47,000 American casualties. This was reflected in the fact that, while in August the Third Army had advanced 600 kilometers (370 mi), it advanced only 35 kilometers (22 mi) between September and December 1944.

The 256,300 man strong U.S. First Army, commanded by General Courtney Hodges, was ordered to break through the Siegfried Line around the area of Aachen, in order to reach the Rur river. Although the First Army began to encircle the area around Aachen in early September, the Battle of Aachen did not end until 21 October. The city cost the Americans roughly 3,000 casualties, but had opened the path to the Rur. Despite the casualties taken the ground gained was comparatively worthless, and the fighting for Aachen had not necessarily brought German defeat any closer.

The Germans, too, had suffered heavy casualties; the 116th Panzer Division, for example, had lost its offensive capabilities after countless attempts to break the U.S. First Army's encirclement of Aachen. This gave American and British commanders a false sense of security, believing that the Wehrmacht did not have the strength to launch a counteroffensive. Given their view on the state of the German armed forces and their need to push to the Rur, the First Army decided to drive German forces out of the Hürtgen Forest—located on the Belgian–German border—in an attempt to take a series of dams which could be used by the Germans to flood the valley below.

The Battle of Hürtgen Forest began on 19 September, with the assault of the 3rd Armored and 9th Infantry Divisions. The battle quickly turned into one of attrition; by mid-October the two Allied divisions had lost nearly 80% of their total combat strength, or roughly 4,500 men, while the Germans had lost close to 3,300. On 2 November the U.S. 28th Infantry Division entered the fight, but was not able to make headway and was forced to defend itself against German counterattacks between 5–7 November. The 28th Infantry Division lost over 6,100 combat casualties in Hürtgen.

Unable to pry the Hürtgen from German hands, the Americans sent the 4th Infantry Division into the battle and between 7 November and 3 December this division lost over 7,000 personnel. After also throwing the 8th Infantry Division into the attack it was able to take the town of Hürtgen, but was not able to advance much farther given the number of casualties it had sustained. In total, American forces suffered 24,000 combat casualties and had failed to reach their original objectives, the dams.

The Germans also suffered heavily; the 47th Panzer Corps had committed its last reserves into the battle and could hardly afford to maintain its defensive line, while the 47th Volksgrenadier Division had suffered over 4,300 casualties during the fighting and the 340th Division had lost nearly 2,000 soldiers. This latter division was replaced by the 363rd Volksgrenadier and 10th SS Panzer Divisions, as the 340th was pulled out in order to be rebuilt.

While the Allied armies continued their slow eastward drive between September and November 1944, the Germans prepared for a counteroffensive. Adolf Hitler, the German leader, believed that by launching an offensive in the West he could force the United States and Great Britain to an early peace, and thereby transfer the entirety of the Wehrmacht to the Eastern Front, where he could bring the Soviet offensive to a standstill and defeat it.

A German victory would be of greater magnitude against the Western Allies than it would against the Soviet Union. According to General Alfred Jodl, "The Russians had so many troops that even if we had succeeded in destroying thirty divisions it would have made no difference. On the other hand, if we destroyed thirty divisions in the West, it would amount to more than a third of the whole invasion Army." Hitler believed that inaction in the West would only conclude in an inevitable German defeat. His basic plan involved an early morning breakthrough along the lightly defended sector of the Ardennes Forest, with the eventual task of crossing the Meuse River and capturing Antwerp in order to deny the Western Allies a crucial port.

== Wehrmacht dispositions ==
By December 1944, German forces defending against continued Western Allied offensives were organized into four separate army groups; three (Army Groups H, B. and G) fell under the command of Field Marshal von Rundstedt, while the fourth (Army Group Öberrhein) fell under the command of Heinrich Himmler. Army Group H, containing the Twenty-fifth and First Parachute Armies was commanded by Luftwaffe Colonel General Kurt Student, while to his south lay Model's Army Group B, containing the Fifteenth, Sixth Panzer, Fifth Panzer and Seventh Armies. The Sixth and Fifth Panzer armies, as well as the Seventh Army, were slated to take part in the upcoming Ardennes offensive. Model's southern flank was protected by Army Group G, commanded by General Hermann Balck, which was composed of the German First Army. In total, the attack would involve thirty divisions, including twelve panzer divisions—roughly 240,000 men.

The offensive's main effort would come from the Sixth Panzer Army, commanded by SS General Sepp Dietrich. The core of the Sixth Panzer Army, composed of four Schutzstaffel (SS) panzer divisions, had been withdrawn from battle early and had gone through a period of rest and refit, redeploying to the front in early November. This army was made up of the I SS Panzer Corps, commanded by General Hermann Priess; this corps included the 1st SS Panzer Division Leibstandarte SS Adolf Hitler, 12th SS Panzer Division Hitlerjugend, 3rd Panzergrenadier Division, and the 12th and 277th Volksgrenadier divisions. The I SS Panzer Corps also included a number of ad hoc vanguard units, including Kampfgruppe Peiper (forming part of the 1st SS Panzer Division), which contained a panzer battalion (72 mixed Panzer IV and Panther tanks) from the 1st SS Panzer Regiment, the 501st SS Heavy Panzer Battalion (45 Tiger Is) and the 3rd SS Panzer Grenadier Battalion. Under the 12th SS Panzer Division was Battle Group Kuhlmann, containing the 1st SS Panzer Battalion (80 tanks) and the 560th SS Heavy Panzer Battalion. Also in the Sixth Panzer Army was the II SS Panzer Corps, offering the 2nd SS Panzer Division Das Reich and the 9th SS Panzer Division Hohenstaufen. Finally, Dietrich's army also included the 326th and 246th Volksgrenadier divisions, forming the 67th (LXVII) Infantry Corps under the command of General Otto Hitzfeld.

South of Dietrich's forces was General Hasso von Manteuffel's Fifth Panzer Army. Manfteuffel's army was formed up by the 66th Infantry Corps (18th and 62nd Volksgrenadier divisions), 58th Panzer Corps (116th Panzer Division and 560th Volksgrenadier Division), the 47th Panzer Corps (2nd Panzer Division and 26th Volksgrenadier Division), the Panzer-Lehr-Division and the Führer Begleit Brigade. Although held as a reserve, the Panzer-Lehr-Division was officially attached to the 47th Panzer Corps. The Fifth Panzer Army was tasked with supporting the Sixth Panzer Army's left flank, and breach the Meuse River by the third day of the offensive. The Fifth Panzer Army was positioned directly opposite the American 28th Infantry Division.

Map showing the positions of German units (in red type) before the Ardennes Offensive

The third army which was to take part in the impending German offensive was General Erich Brandenberger's Seventh Army, which was tasked with protecting the Fifth Panzer Army's left flank and tying down Allied reserves in Luxembourg. This army included General Baptist Kniess' 85th Infantry Corps (consisting of the 5th Fallschirmjäger and 352nd Volksgrenadier divisions), General Franz Beyer's 80th Infantry Corps (276th and 212th Volksgrenadier Divisions) and Kavallerie Graf von Rothkirch und Trach's 8th Infantry Corps. These three armies offered five panzer divisions, thirteen infantry-type divisions (airborne and volksgrenadier) for immediate assault, and another two panzer divisions and a panzer brigade in immediate support; these represented 70% of the strength which Hitler had originally decided to allot to the Ardennes offensive.

=== Special units ===
The Germans also planned an airborne operation (Operation Stösser) in the area north of Malmédy in order to take the road junction at Baraque Michel, allowing the Sixth Army's 12th SS Panzer Division to advance to the Belgian city of Liège. The operation would be undertaken by a special unit formed up of one hundred paratroopers from each battalion of Army Group H's First Parachute Army. The battalion-sized unit would be commanded by Lieutenant Colonel Friedrich August Freiherr von der Heydte and was named Battle Group von der Heydte. Although von der Heydte originally requested to use the entirety of the 6th Parachute Regiment, this was denied on the basis that it would alert the Western Allies to the intentions of the Wehrmacht; ultimately, however, the German general was allowed to hand pick his platoon and company commanders.

Unfortunately, many of the men to choose from were not even airborne qualified, and about 20% of those chosen for the operation were not qualified to jump with weapons. General von der Heydte immediately dismissed the worst 150 men given to him and replaced them with volunteers from the parachute school, some of whom did not have any jump experience. In the little time available some men received basic jump training, although matters were complicated by the lack of transport aircraft. Kampfgruppe von der Heydte also had at their disposal some 300 dummy parachutists, meant to be dropped north of the actual drop zone in order to confuse American forces. By 15 December 1944, von der Heydte was able to put together a decent fighting force.

Operation Greif, commanded by Otto Skorzeny's 150th Panzer brigade, was designed to capture certain bridges over the Meuse River. Skorzeny was ordered to dress his brigade in American and British uniforms, while using Western Allied vehicles and speaking English, in an effort to not only capture those bridges, but to pass on false orders and confuse Allied forces defending the breakthrough sector. The unit's men were not alerted to the intentions of the offensive until the very last minute; they were warned that their preparations were for an impending Allied offensive. The effort to recruit for the unit was nearly compromised by an army-wide order requesting the names of English-speaking personnel and any captured Allied vehicles; although Skorzeny originally attempted to cancel the operation, he later turned the misfortune around by allowing rumors of the unit to circulate freely in order to hide the truth. Skorzeny was also wary of the fact that he and his men would have to wear American uniforms, which risked having them shot as spies if captured; ultimately, his men were allowed to wear German uniforms under their American clothing.

Ultimately, of the 500 men attached to the force, only around 10 were able to speak English fluently, while 30–40 could speak it well enough, 120–150 fairly well and the rest only what they had learned in grade school. With only two working M4 Sherman tanks available, 13 Panther tanks were doctored to resemble American tanks and attached to the unit; Skorzeny was also given 10 Allied scout cars, with six of them breaking down during the training period. The unit was also low on American small-arms and ammunition, not to mention American uniforms; nevertheless, the unit continued training.

=== Luftwaffe deployments ===
Hitler promised his army commanders complete air support, reporting that Goering had told him that the Luftwaffe was able to deploy some 3,000 fighters for the operation; although the German leader also commented to discount 1,000 from the report, due to Goering's tendency to exaggerate, he said that there would be nonetheless at least 2,000 fighters to protect German ground forces. These aircraft were to support the Fifth and Sixth Panzer Armies, as well as launch a preemptive aerial offensive aimed at destroying Allied aircraft on the ground, before they had a chance to be used against the Germans. This figure was later revised to 800–900 aircraft, which would be taken from squadrons slotted to defend against Allied bombing raids over German cities. The offensive had also been scheduled to take place when the weather prohibited Allied air support.

== Mobilization and movements ==
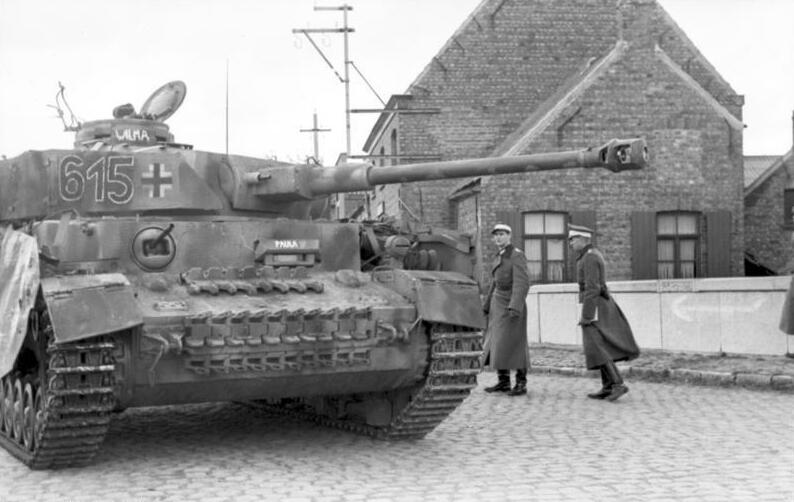
Despite a decrease in production of specific tank models, in 1944 more tanks were produced than in 1943

The Wehrmacht suffered nearly 750,000 casualties between June and November 1944, forcing the German leadership to recruit from the Kriegsmarine, Luftwaffe, and industry, while extending the call-up age to all males between 16 and 60 years of age. This extension allowed the Germans to increase their manpower in Western Europe from around 410,000 on 1 December to just over 1.3 million on 15 December. These new soldiers were poorly trained, and this was exacerbated by the fact that most did not know of the offensive until days before it was launched, meaning many were not even informed of their objectives. The volksgrenadier divisions ordered to protect the flanks of the three advancing armies were not even properly reinforced, because the Germans found it difficult to detach these units from areas of the front being pressured by the slow Allied advance.

Field Marshal von Rundstedt made repeated requests for more men, noting that the Western Allies were completely superior in manpower, yet was denied by Wehrmacht High Command. Rundstedt noted the difficulty of holding encircled American troops once the operation began, due to the lack of sufficient infantrymen. New infantrymen received a maximum of eight weeks worth of training, and the new divisions were deficient of anti-tank and artillery weapons; their make-up was at best eclectic, as divisions were formed from the remnants of units which had taken heavy casualties in fighting in the West or on the Eastern Front. Some new infantrymen had been recruited from occupied territories in the East, and so many new soldiers did not even know German.

The forces in best condition, earmarked for the Ardennes Offensive, were those which belonged to the Waffen-SS; these forces were refitted and trained inside Germany, and then deployed to the front. But, even these were sometimes undermanned; the 2nd SS Panzer Division, for example, was 10% below the established manpower requirements. Even by 15 December, the transfer of personnel to the West had not been completed.

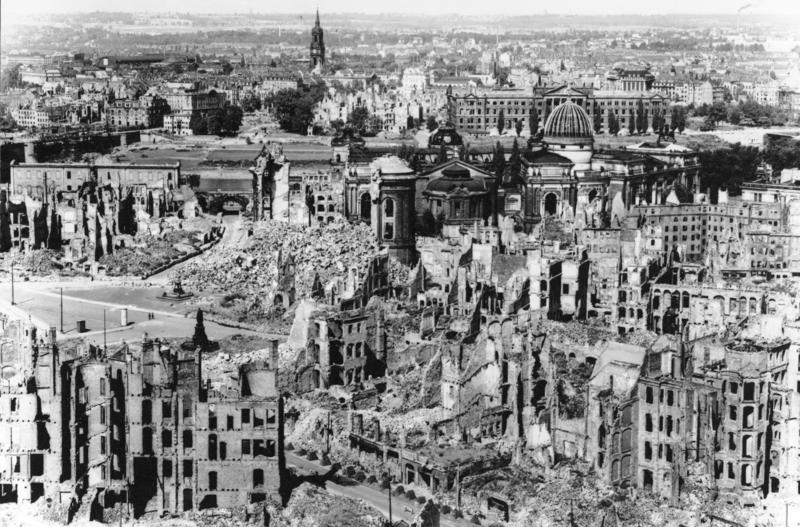
The Western Allied bombing campaign over Germany hindered German war production

Although Western Allied bomber missions increased in intensity as the war progressed, 1944 was marked with some of the highest production rates for German industry; for example, while in January 1944 1,017 fighter aircraft had been manufactured, in September of that year 2,878 were built. Similarly, in 1943 6,083 tanks of all types had been produced, while 8,466 were manufactured in 1944. However, the effects of the air raids did real damage; for example, Panzer IV production decreased from 300 in August 1944 to only 180 in September, because the steel plant producing the tank's armor had been destroyed by Allied bombers. Panther tank production also decreased since July 1944 due to the Allied bombing raids.

Nevertheless, the Germans amassed close to 1,400 armored fighting vehicles for the offensive. Allied bombers also affected the movement of supplies to the front, though some 500 trainloads of equipment, fuel and ammunition were delivered without being discovered, despite Allied control of the skies. This, however, was not able to cope with the shortage of small-arms; 1.5 million infantry weapons were required to arm the new volksgrenadiers. Ammunition was in dire need, as well, and ultimately the rail system was forced to stop troop movements in favor of moving more supplies to the front.

Fuel was in considerable shortage, as well; although the Germans stockpiled the 2,303,000,000 litres (507,000,000 imp gal) of fuel required for the initial phase of the offensive, half of it was not delivered because of transportation shortages. Of the petroleum stocked for the offensive, much of it was released to units operating along the front, fighting against American and British actions in the Lorraine and around Aachen. Some 18,184,360 litres (4,000,000 imp gal) were supposed to be accumulated for the first days of the offensive, in the hope that much more would be captured by the advance; by early December less than 9,092,180 litres (2,000,000 imp gal) were available, and only around 14,411,100 litres (3,170,000 imp gal) were available by the start of the offensive. Furthermore, initial fuel consumption estimates were incorrect because they had not taken into account the increase in fuel consumption which resulted from movement over the terrain of the Ardennes, including the snow.

== Impact on the Eastern Front ==
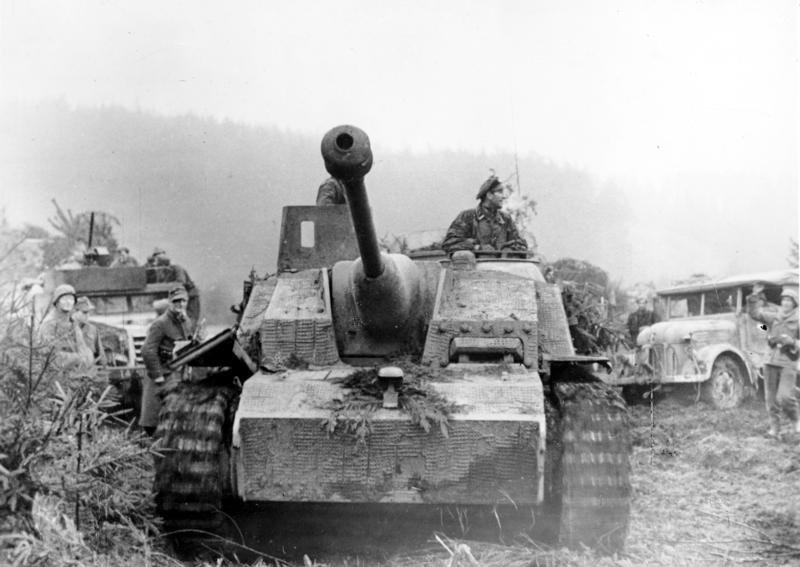
Much of the Wehrmacht's armor was deployed to the Western Front, leaving Eastern Front units understrength

On the eve of the Soviet Vistula–Oder Offensive, in January 1945, the Red Army had 1,670,000 soldiers, 28,360 artillery guns and heavy mortars, over a thousand Katyusha rocket launchers, 3,300 armored fighting vehicles and nearly 3,000 aircraft. Against this, two out of five army groups positioned on the Eastern Front, Army Group Center and Army Group A, lay in the path of the Soviet offensive; together, they could count on roughly 980,000 personnel, 1,800 armored fighting vehicles, and nearly 900 combat aircraft. During December 1944 the Wehrmacht had concentrated the bulk of its mechanized forces and logistical support on the Western Front, reducing its ability to defend Germany's eastern border from the Soviet Union. For example, 2,299 new and refitted tanks had been delivered to the Western Front by December 1944, while German forces in the East had only received approximately 920. In January 1945 the Wehrmacht was roughly 800,000 men short of complete strength, despite the reorganization of German units in order to take into consideration manpower losses, much of its strength used for the Ardennes Offensive.

This was made clear to the German Armed Forces' high command when General Heinz Guderian presented them with intelligence on the impending Soviet assault, and on a comparison of strength; the German general claimed that the Red Army had an advantage of eleven to one in infantry, seven to one in armor and twenty to one in artillery. It was then mentioned that the defense of the Eastern Front would require the redeployment of armored divisions from the Ardennes. In fact, von Rundstedt had asked for the Ardennes Offensive to be called off on 22 December 1944, in favor of reorienting Germany's armored strength to the East, but this was flatly refused by Hitler. The offensive against American forces in the Ardennes forest had preoccupied Hitler's mind, and the Eastern Front had suddenly become of secondary importance to the Wehrmacht High Command For example, the Sixth Panzer Army would not be transferred to the Eastern Front until 16 January 1945.
