= 10th Parachute Division =

10th Parachute Division may refer to:

- 10th Parachute Division (France)
- 10th Parachute Division (Germany)
- 10th Guards Airborne Division, Soviet Union

== See also ==
- 10th Division (disambiguation)
