= Friedrich August Freiherr von der Heydte =

German military officer, academic and politician (1907–1994)

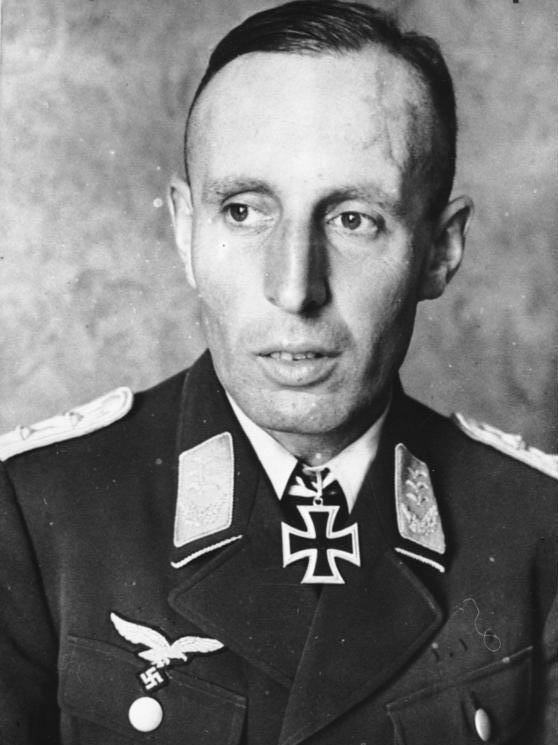
- Heydte in 1941
- Born: 30 March 1907; Munich, Kingdom of Bavaria, German Empire
- Died: 7 July 1994 (aged 87); Aham, Landshut, Bavaria, Germany
- Military career
- Allegiance: Weimar Republic (to 1933); Nazi Germany; West Germany
- Branch: Reichswehr; Luftwaffe; German Army
- Service years: 1925–45, 1957–67
- Rank: Oberstleutnant (Fallschirmjäger); Brigadegeneral (Bundeswehr)
- Conflicts: World War II
- Awards: Knight's Cross of the Iron Cross with Oak Leaves

Friedrich August Freiherr von der Heydte (30 March 1907 – 7 July 1994) was a German paratroop officer during World War II who later served in the armed forces of West Germany, achieving the rank of General. Following the war, Heydte pursued academic, political and military careers, as a Catholic-conservative professor of political science, a member of the Christian Social Union political party, and as a Bundeswehr reservist. In 1962, Heydte was involved in the Spiegel affair.

== Early life ==
Friedrich August Freiherr von der Heydte joined the Reichswehr in April 1925. In 1927, he was released from military service to attend the University of Innsbruck, receiving a degree in economics. In 1927, Heydte was awarded his degree in law at the University of Graz. He joined the NSDAP on 1 May 1933, obtaining membership number 2.134.193. He entered the Sturm Abteilung the same year. In 1935 Heydte re-joined the Reichswehr where he attended staff training.

Meanwhile, Heydte had begun his academic career in international law in 1933 as a private assistant to Hans Kelsen in Cologne on Alfred Verdross's recommendation. Following Kelsen's dismissal in the wake of the Nazi seizure of power in Germany, Heydte became Verdross's assistant at the Consular Academy in Vienna (1933–1934). Because of his National Socialist activities, he had to leave the Consular Academy in 1934 and became an assistant to Karl Gottfried Hugelmann at the University of Münster.

== World War II ==
Heydte took part in the invasion of Poland and the Battle of France as a junior commander. In May 1940, he was transferred to Luftwaffe's parachute arm; he commanded a battalion during the Battle of Crete in May 1941. From October 1941 he fought with his battalion in Russia. During this period he participated in an event of killing Jews "as a sport" organized by an SS commander - this is according to von der Heydte's testimony as recorded while he was a prisoner in England. Heydte recalled that at a dinner party hosted by an SS officer, guests were driven out in a car and "it sounds like a fairy tale but it's a fact - shotguns were lying about and 30 Polish Jews were standing there. Each guest was given a gun; the Jews were driven past and every one was allowed to have a pot shot at a Jew." In July 1942 Heydte was sent to Libya as commander of the Fallschirm-Lehrbataillon, part of the Ramcke Parachute Brigade. Heydte was an officer in the Ramcke Brigade in North Africa until February 1943 when he and several other officers were transferred to France to form the nucleus of the new 2nd Fallschirmjäger Division under command of major-general H.B. Ramcke. He was posted as an operations officer in the divisional HQ.

After the fall of Sicily during the summer of 1943, the Germans grew wary of a potential Italian defection to the Allies. To counter this event the 2nd Fallschirmjäger Division was transferred from France to Rome on 6 August. Heydte gained audience with Pope Pius XII and befriended the Pope's "Throne Assistant", the theologian Alois Hudal, who would later become a key person in helping Nazi war criminals evade the courts of justice during the post-war war-crime trials. The division participated in taking Rome under German control as part of the German Operation Achse.

Heydte was given command of a regiment of the 2nd Fallschirmjäger Division in January 1944. By the time of Operation Overlord, the 6th Fallschirmjäger Regiment had been attached to the 91st Luftlande Infantry Division. Heydte's unit took part in the Battle of Carentan, Operation Lüttich, and in fighting against the Allied forces in Operation Market Garden.

=== Operation Stösser ===
Prior to the Ardennes Offensive, the Germans planned Operation Stösser to drop paratroopers behind the American lines 11 kilometres (6.8 mi) north of Malmedy and to seize a key crossroads (N68-N672) leading to the towns of Eupen and Verviers. To conceal the plans from the Allies and preserve secrecy, Heydte was not allowed to use his own, experienced troops. Most of the new paratroops had little training.

The Luftwaffe assembled 112 Ju 52 transport planes; they were manned by inexperienced pilots. It was the German paratroopers' only nighttime drop during World War II. While the aircraft took off with around 1,300 paratroops, the pilots dropped some behind the German front lines, others over Bonn, and only a few hundred in widely scattered locations behind the American lines. Some aircraft landed with their troops still on board. Only a fraction of the force landed near the intended drop zone.

The kampfgruppe was tasked with dropping at night onto a strategic road junction 11 kilometers north of Malmedy and to hold it for approximately twenty-four hours until relieved by the 12th SS Panzer Division, with the aim of hampering the flow of Allied reinforcements and supplies. The planes that were relatively close to the intended drop zone were buffeted by strong winds that deflected many paratroopers and made their landings far rougher. Since many of the German paratroopers were very inexperienced, some were crippled upon impact and died where they fell. Some of their bodies were found the following spring as the snow melted. Heydte broke his arm upon landing from his jump.

Initially, only 125 men made it to the correct landing zone, with no heavy weapons. By noon on 17 December, Heydte's unit had scouted the woods and rounded up a total of around 300 troops. With only enough ammunition for a single fight, the force was too small to take the crossroads on its own. But because of the dispersal of the drop, German paratroops were reported all over the Ardennes, and the Allies believed a division-sized jump had taken place. This caused much confusion and convinced them to allocate men to secure the rear instead of facing the main German thrust at the front.

Because all his radios had been destroyed or lost in the jump, Heydte did not know that the 12th SS Panzer Division failed to defeat the Americans at the Battle of Elsenborn Ridge, and was unable to relieve his forces. Cut off, without supplies and pursued by the U.S. forces, Heydte ordered his men to break through Allied lines and reach the German lines. Heydte arrived in Monschau on 21 December and surrendered on 23 December. He was held as a prisoner of war in England until July 1947.

== Post-war career ==
After his release as a POW, Heydte returned to his academic career, completing his dissertation in 1950 at the Ludwig-Maximilians-Universität München under Erich Kaufmann, whom he had met at The Hague Academy of International Law before the outbreak of World War II. In 1951, he became a professor of constitutional and international law at the University of Mainz. From 1954, he served as a professor of International Law, General Administrative Law, German and Bavarian State Law and Political Science at the University of Würzburg. He also headed the Institute for Military Law at the University of Würzburg. From 1956 to 1971, he was a member of the Institute of International Law. From 1961 to 1965, he served as a member of the board of the German Society for International Law. Parallel to his academic occupation, Heydte resumed his military career with the West German Bundeswehr; in 1962, he was promoted to Brigadier General in the Reserves, and in 1967, he was retired, concluding 30 years of military service.

In 1947, Heydte joined the Christian Social Union (CSU), where he was chairman of the Christian Democratic Higher Education Association. From 1966 to 1970 he was a member of the constituency for Lower Franconia at the Bavarian Parliament. He was also a member of the Committee on Cultural Policy issues and in 1967, he joined the Bavarian State Office for Political Education and the State Compensation Office. He was a supporter of the theological ideas of natural law and as a conservative Christian he supported the Catholic Church's principles of justice.

== Controversies ==
=== Flick affair ===
In 1985, Heydte became one of the central figures in the Flick affair, a serious party funding scandal in which Heydte allegedly had, as the director of the Würzburg Institute of Political Science and Policy Association for many years, helped to launder money for political donations to the CDU/CSU and FDP. He had to appear before the Federal Constitutional Court of Germany on the issue of party funding through tax-deferred contributions.

=== Spiegel affair ===
In 1962, as head of the Institute for Military Law at the University of Würzburg, Heydte challenged the weekly magazine Der Spiegel over an article it published claiming a "scandalous" state of affairs in the Bundeswehr. Specifically, Von der Heydte accused the editors of high treason because they had revealed the military weaknesses of the new Bundeswehr to the public and thus to the Soviets. Because of that accusation and Heydte's position as an expert in military law, the issue was brought to a federal court, triggering what was to be known as the Spiegel affair, with many arrests of journalists and others connected to that publication.

The police raid on Der Spiegel was forcefully led by Theo Saevecke, the Kriminalrat at Sicherungsgruppe Bonn. Saevecke's wartime past was soon revealed. He had achieved the rank of SS-Hauptsturmführer and served with SS-Einsatzgruppe IV in Poland (1939–40), the SS-Sicherheitsdienst in North Africa (1942–43) and commanded the Gestapo and Italian fascist police in Milan (from 1943 to 1945). All these associations marked him as a potential war criminal. Heydte's and Saevecke's conduct in the Spiegel affair caused a public outcry followed by demonstrations and public debates. The Spiegel affair was the first sign of a change in the popular beliefs in West Germany and the progenitor of all the protest later in that decade against all former Nazi German officials still in office. Heydte was heavily criticised for his actions by several prominent West German politicians, and in 1965, a court cleared the editors of Der Spiegel on all charges.

== Death ==
Heydte died in Aham, Landshut, in 1994 after a long illness.

== Works ==
- Daedalus Returned (Hutchinson, 1958) - An account of the Battle of Crete.
- Der moderne Kleinkrieg als wehrpolitisches und militärisches Phänomen (Modern Irregular Warfare as a Phenomenon of Military Policy); Executive Intelligence Review, Nachrichtenagentur GmbH, Wiesbaden, Neuausgabe 1986 ISBN 3-925725-03-2 (Erstausgabe: Holzner-Verlag, Würzburg 1972)

== Awards and honours ==
- Iron Cross (1939) 2nd Class (27 September 1939) & 1st Class (26 September 1940)
- German Cross in Gold on 9 March 1942 as Hauptmann in the I./Fallschirmjäger-Regiment 3
- Knight's Cross of the Iron Cross with Oak Leaves
  - Knight's Cross on 9 July 1941 as Hauptmann and commander of the I./Fallschirmjäger-Regiment 3
  - Oak Leaves on 30 September 1944 as Oberstleutnant and commander of Fallschirmjäger-Regiment 6
- Bavarian Order of Merit (21 May 1974)
- Grand Cross of Merit of the Federal Republic of Germany (17 March 1987)
