= Bern von Baer =

German military officer

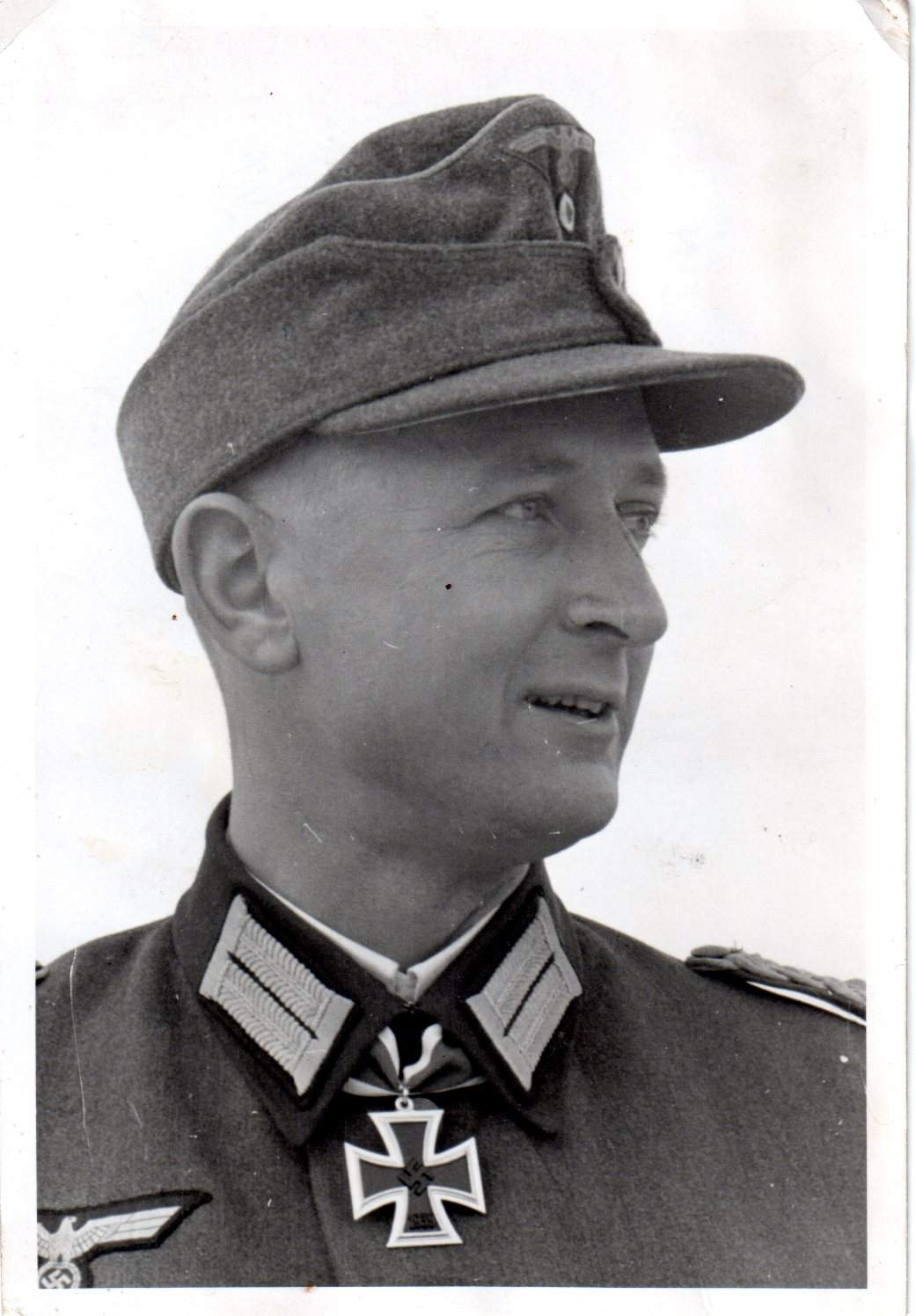
- Born: 20 March 1911; Berlin
- Died: 27 November 1981 (aged 70); Rösrath
- Military career
- Allegiance: Weimar Republic; Nazi Germany; West Germany
- Branch: Reichsheer; German Army; German Army
- Service years: 1930–45; 1955–68
- Rank: Oberst i.G. (Wehrmacht); Generalmajor (Bundeswehr)
- Commands: III Corps
- Conflicts: World War II: Invasion of Poland; Battle of France; Battle of Stalingrad; Allied invasion of Italy; Cherkassy Pocket; Hube's Pocket; Vistula–Oder Offensive; Heiligenbeil Pocket; Battle of Bautzen (1945)
- Awards: Knight's Cross of the Iron Cross with Oak Leaves

Bern Oskar von Baer (20 March 1911 – 27 November 1981) was an officer in the Wehrmacht of Nazi Germany during World War II and a Major General in the Bundeswehr of West Germany, retiring in 1968.

On January 23, 1943, he was ordered out of the encircled city of Stalingrad by Field Marshal Paulus on one of the last Luftwaffe flights out. He served with the 16th Panzer Division and later, the Hermann Göring Parachute Panzer Division. He was a 1944 recipient of the Knight's Cross of the Iron Cross with Oak Leaves.

== Awards and decorations ==
- Iron Cross (1939) 2nd Class (21 September 1939) & 1st Class (29 May 1940)
- Knight's Cross of the Iron Cross with Oak Leaves
  - Knight's Cross on 13 January 1944 as Oberstleutnant im Generalstab (in the General Staff) and Ia (operations officer) of the 16. Panzer-Division
  - 761st Oak Leaves on 28 February 1945 as Oberstleutnant im Generalstab and chief of Stab/Fallschirmjäger-Panzer-Korps "Hermann Göring"
- Great Cross of Merit of the Federal Republic of Germany (20 March 1968)

Military offices
Preceded by none	Commander of the 1. Luftlande-Division (Bundeswehr); January 1956 – September 1957	Succeeded by Generalmajor Hans Kroh
