= Hermann-Bernhard Ramcke =

German general

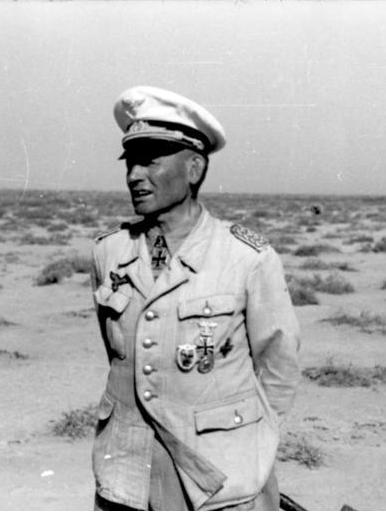
- Born: 24 January 1889; Schleswig, German Empire
- Died: 4 July 1968 (aged 79); Kappeln, West Germany
- Military career
- Allegiance: German Empire; Weimar Republic; Nazi Germany
- Branch: Imperial German Navy; Reichswehr; German Army; Luftwaffe
- Service years: 1905–1945
- Rank: General der Fallschirmtruppe
- Unit: 1st Parachute Division
- Commands: Ramcke Parachute Brigade; German 2nd Parachute Division; Fortress Brest
- Conflicts: World War I; Russian Civil War; World War II; Battle of Crete; Second Battle of El Alamein; Battle for Brest (surrendered)
- Awards: Knight's Cross of the Iron Cross with Oak Leaves, Swords and Diamonds
- Criminal information
- Conviction: War crimes
- Penalty: 5 years and 6 months imprisonment

Details
- Victims: French civilians

Hermann-Bernhard Ramcke (24 January 1889 – 4 July 1968) was a German general of paratroop forces during World War II. He led units in Crete, North Africa, Italy, the Soviet Union and France, and was captured by American forces at the conclusion of the Battle for Brest in September 1944. He was a recipient of the Knight's Cross of the Iron Cross with Oak Leaves, Swords and Diamonds, one of only 27 people in the German military so decorated. Ramcke's career was unusual in that he served in all three branches of the German Wehrmacht.

Ramcke was an ardent Nazi who committed war crimes in Crete and France. Following the fighting on Crete in 1941, he ordered his men to attack civilians. In 1951 Ramcke was convicted of war crimes against French civilians during the Battle for Brest, but was released after three months, since he had already spent nearly five years in prison. During the 1950s he was a prominent nationalist and supported extreme right-wing movements.

== World War I ==
Born in 1889, Ramcke joined the Imperial German Navy in 1905 and served during the First World War. Ramcke fought in the West with the Marine-Infanterie, mainly in the area of Flanders. In 1916 he was decorated with the Iron Cross second class and later the Iron Cross first class. After a defensive action against three British attacks he was decorated with the Prussian Golden Merit Cross, the highest decoration for non-commissioned officers in the German Imperial Forces.

In 1919 Ramcke fought against the Bolshevik forces in the Baltic region as a member of the West Russian Volunteer Army, composed mostly of German veterans. Ramcke stayed in the Reichswehr during the Weimar Republic period. He continued to serve in the new Wehrmacht, attaining the rank of Oberstleutnant in 1937.

== World War II ==
=== Mediterranean ===
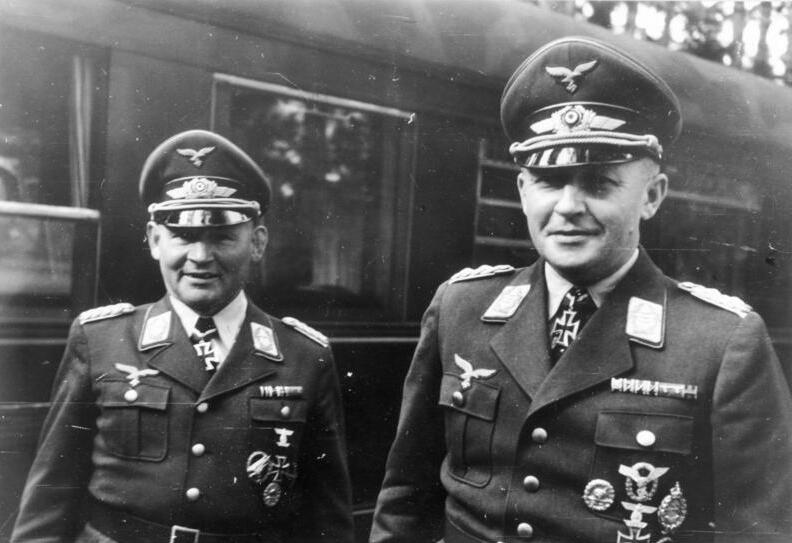
Ramcke (left) and Student in 1941

On 19 July 1940, Ramcke was transferred to the 7th Flieger Division under the command of General Kurt Student and was promoted to Oberst. At the age of 51 he successfully completed the parachute qualification course. In May 1941 working with the division Stab he helped plan and also took part in Operation Merkur, the airborne attack on Crete. Forces under his command captured an airfield which was used to fly in reinforcements. After the costly victory in Crete, remainders of several paratroop units were formed into an ad hoc brigade, and command was given to Ramcke. He was promoted to Generalmajor on 22 July 1941. While on Crete, Ramcke ordered his men to attack civilians in villages where the mutilated bodies of German paratroopers had been found.

In 1942, Ramcke's unit, later known as Ramcke Parachute Brigade, was sent to North Africa to join Rommel's Afrikakorps. The brigade supported the offensive towards the Suez Canal, but when the offensive got bogged down they entered the line at El Alamein. During the withdrawal of the Afrikakorps, the brigade was surrounded and written off as lost by the high command since it had no organic transport. Rather than surrender, Ramcke led his troops out of the British trap and headed west, losing about 450 men in the process. They soon captured a British supply column that provided not only trucks, but also food, tobacco and other luxuries. About 600 of the paras later rejoined the Afrikakorps in late November 1942. Ramcke was sent back to Germany, where he was awarded the Oak Leaves to the Knights Cross personally by Adolf Hitler.

In 1943 Ramcke, now a generalleutnant, took command of 2nd Parachute Division and transferred to Italy. When Italy signed the armistice with the Allies on 8 September 1943, the division took part in Operation Achse to seize the country. Ramcke led his division in an assault on Italian Army units near Rome, and captured the city two days later. He was badly injured when an Italian aircraft ran his car off the road, and was medically evacuated to Germany.

Also in 1943, Ramcke completed a memoir entitled From Cabin Boy to Paratroop General. The book was published by Franz Eher Nachfolger, the Nazi Party's press, and Minister of Propaganda Joseph Goebbels ordered all German mayors to purchase a copy. A total of 400,000 copies of the book were sold. This considerably enriched Ramcke as well as Hitler, who owned a large share of the publisher.

=== Brittany ===
Ramcke returned to service in mid-February 1944. At this time the 2nd Parachute Division was deployed to the Eastern Front where it was retreating. Ramcke soon fell ill, and returned to Germany on 17 March. He rejoined the division, which was now stationed near Cologne, on 5 or 6 May.

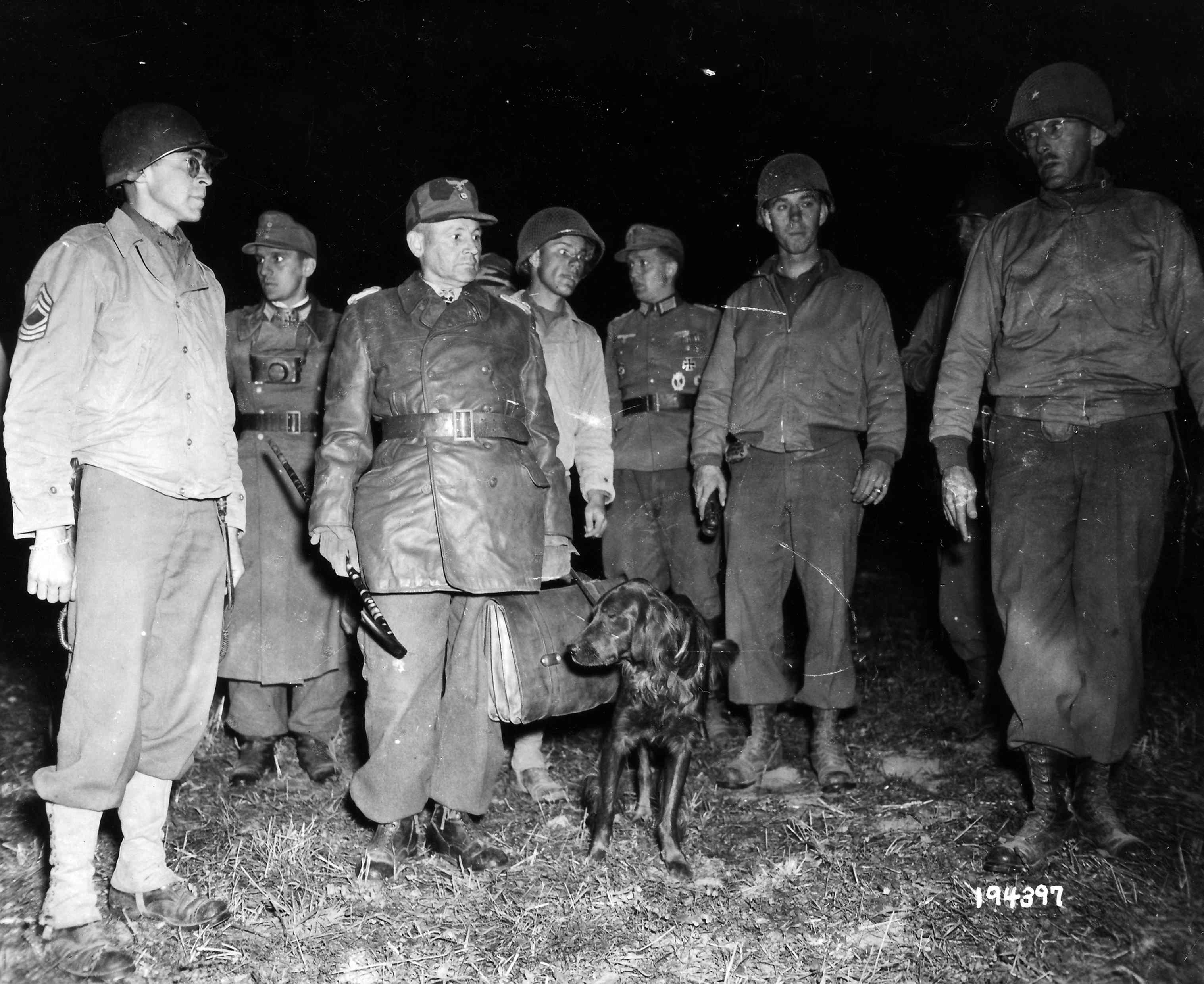
Ramcke after being captured by US Army troops on 19 September 1944

Following the Allied D-Day landings on 6 June, 2nd Parachute Division was sent to the Brittany region of France, and took up defensive positions at Brest. Following Operation Cobra, the allied breakout from Normandy, Major-General Troy H. Middleton's U.S. VIII Corps hooked right from Normandy and attacked the Brittany region. The German forces in the region fell back on Brest, and Ramcke assumed command of the garrison, now known as Festung Brest. Commanding about 30,000 German troops during the Battle for Brest, Ramcke was ordered by Hitler to fight to the last man. He was determined to carry out this order, and justified doing so on the grounds that continuing the resistance at Brest would divert Allied forces away from Germany. Prior to the start of the battle Ramcke evacuated large numbers of French civilians from Brest. Ramcke deployed the paratroopers to strengthen positions held by poorly trained and equipped units, including the 343rd Infantry Division, who made up most of the garrison. He also ordered the destruction of all facilities in Brest which could be used by the Allied forces for any purpose.

The Battle for Brest began on 21 August. After heavy fighting, US Army forces pierced Brest's defences by 13 September. On that day Middleton sent Ramcke a letter proposing that he surrender the garrison "with honour". Ramcke rejected the overture. After learning of this decision, Middleton instructed his men to "take the Germans apart". Historian Derek R. Mallett has called Ramcke's actions during the Battle of Brest "fanatical".

Most of the surviving German soldiers surrendered on 18 September, but Ramcke attempted to escape from the city. Ramcke led what the US Army official history described as "a group of diehards", which was forced to surrender on 19 September. When U.S. Brigadier General, Charles Canham, who was at the time the deputy commander of the 8th Infantry Division, arrived to accept the surrender of German troops in Brest, Ramcke asked the lower-ranking man (Canham) to show his credentials. Canham pointed to his nearby troops and said "These are my credentials." That phrase has since become the motto of the 8th Infantry Division. On the same day of the surrender he was awarded the Swords (99th Recipient) & Diamonds (20th recipient) to the Knight's Cross.

According to the documents about Wilton Park Estate residents, he was caught in his bunker with a French woman, an Irish Setter and Major General Hans von der Mosel, and brought to the Park just in two days since his capture. In order to make him cooperative MI19 drafted fake press release from a newspaper about getting an award of Knight's Cross of the Iron Cross with diamonds from Hitler himself.

== Post-war ==
=== Imprisonment and war crimes trial ===
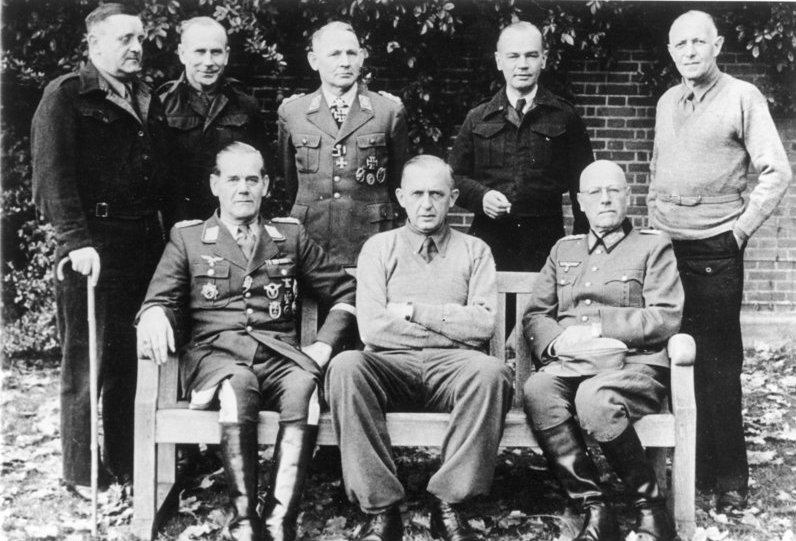
Ramcke at Trent Park

After being taken prisoner, Ramcke was interrogated by an American officer. During this interrogation he expressed strong support for the Nazi Party, claimed that Germany was a "clean innocent nation greatly wronged by other nations" and that after the war he would prepare his sons to help Germany rise again. The American officer judged that Ramcke was "an egotistical, conceited Nazi" and "a firm believer in Hitler and greatly inclined to the [Nazi] Party". Ramcke was then transferred to the Trent Park facility for captured senior German officers in London. The British officers who ran the facility also considered him to be one of the most vocal supporters of the Nazi Party they had encountered. A report prepared on Ramcke stated that "if there [was] to be such a thing as a list of especially dangerous men to be kept under surveillance [after the war], General Ramcke ought to qualify as one of the first candidates". While at Trent Park, Ramcke boasted about destroying Brest in a conversation with Dietrich von Choltitz, the last commander of German-occupied Paris. Von Choltitz believed that Ramcke's actions constituted a war crime.

Ramcke was later moved to the United States as a prisoner of war. On 1 January 1946 he briefly escaped from Camp Clinton, Mississippi to post letters protesting about American propaganda campaigns and the withdrawal of tobacco and other luxury items from the POWs to Byron Price, the director of the Office for Censorship, and Senator James Eastland. After the camp authorities learned of Ramcke's escape, he was transferred to Camp Shelby in Mississippi and held in solitary confinement on a diet of bread and water for four days.

Ramcke was returned to Europe in March 1946. After a brief period in Belgium, he was transferred to the London Cage. Historian Helen Fry has written that he was considered at this time to be a "bombastic nasty man who sought to blame others for the crimes of the regime". During his interrogation at the London Cage Ramcke retracted claims that New Zealand soldiers, including Māori personnel, had committed atrocities during the fighting on Crete which were contained in the book of memoirs he had written while in American custody. Ramcke was later transferred to a camp at Lüneburg and gave evidence in Student's war crimes trial. He was greatly angered when Student was convicted.

From 1946 Ramcke was held in French custody awaiting trial for war crimes relating to the fighting at Brest. The crimes he was charged with included the execution of French civilians, the looting of civilian property and the intentional destruction of civilian houses. After being held in custody for 57 months he escaped to Germany to see his family, but surrendered himself soon afterwards. Following a trial, he was found guilty on 21 March 1951, and sentenced to five years and six months' imprisonment. He was released after three months' imprisonment either on account of his age or due to having already been held in French captivity for five years before the verdict.

=== Nationalist political activities ===
Following his release from nearly seven years captivity, Ramcke, through his public actions, became seen as a dedicated nationalist (Note: Included in one Orders of the Day for Ramcke's command in September 1944 was The US Army was the "instrument of the international Jewish clique which is based in Wall Street, New York, and from there wants to subjugate the entire world in co-operation with Russian Bolshevism... The people of the United States of America are no single, united race. They are made up of all the world's races, the good and the inferior. Among the inferior, the blacks and mixed races stand out"—comments which reflect the peculiarly racist outlook of the Third Reich. Mitcham points out that Ramcke's second-in-command, Hans Kroh, who assumed command of Ramcke's 2ndFJD at Brest, is believed to have had strong Nazi party connections and reasonably may have functioned in the political officer role in preparing orders.) by his fellow generals and supported extreme right-wing movements such as the Naumann-Kreis in Germany. During an address to a meeting of the German paratrooper veterans' association in July 1951, Ramcke criticised what he claimed was Allied defamation of former German soldiers, and called for the release of "so-called war criminals." At a rally of SS veterans in October 1952 Ramcke gave a lengthy speech critical of the Western Allies, during which he claimed that they were the real war criminals.

In November 1952, Ramcke told a group of former SS men attending a HIAG meeting they should be proud of being blacklisted, while stating that in the future their blacklist would instead be seen as a "list of honor." Ramcke's remarks caused a furor in Germany; even the former SS General Felix Steiner distanced himself from them. Konrad Adenauer was so furious with Ramcke's remarks that he directed Thomas Dehler, the German federal Minister of Justice, to investigate the possibility of prosecuting Ramcke. Adenauer publicly described Ramcke's remarks as "irresponsible" and his associated behavior as "foolishness"—a reaction likely prompted since Adenauer's government had made a significant effort to obtain the early release for Ramcke from French custody.

Ramcke and his supporters argued that the intent of his actions following the war was to again seek to protect his men, both in their reputations and their future, such as in cautioning against their being used as "cannon fodder" in the speech to ex-paratroopers during the rearmament debate. This was consistent with his behavior throughout his military career. Ramcke published two autobiographies, one during the war and the other in 1951. He died in 1968.

== Awards ==
- Prussian Iron Cross of 1914 2nd Class on 17 April 1916 & 1st Class on 27 January 1917
- Prussian Golden Military Merit Cross on 24 April 1918
- Clasp to the Iron Cross of 1939 2nd Class on 1 October 1939 & 1st Class on 23 May 1941
- Knight's Cross of the Iron Cross with Oak Leaves, Swords and Diamonds
  - Knight's Cross on 21 August 1941 as Oberst and commander of the Fallschirmjäger-Sturm-Regiment
  - 145th Oak Leaves on 13 November 1942 as Generalmajor and commander of Fallschirmjäger-Brigade "Ramcke"
  - 99th Swords on 19 September 1944 as General der Fallschirmtruppe and commander of Fortress Brest
  - 20th Diamonds on 19 September 1944 as General der Fallschirmtruppe and commander of Fortress Brest

== Works ==
- Vom Ritterkreuzträger zum Angeklagten. Nation-Europa-Verlag, Coburg 2001. ISBN 3-920677-57-9.
- Fallschirmjäger. Schütz, Preußisch Oldendorf 1973.
- Fallschirmjäger, damals und danach. Lorch, Frankfurt am Main 1951.
- Vom Schiffsjungen zum Fallschirmjäger-General. Verlag Die Wehrmacht, Berlin 1943.

== Notes ==
Military offices
| Preceded by none | Commander of Fallschirmjäger-Brigade Ramcke; 1 April 1942 – 30 November 1942 | Succeeded by Oberst Hans Kroh |
| Preceded by none | Commander of 2. Fallschirmjäger-Division; 2 February 1943 – 13 September 1943 | Succeeded by Generalmajor Walter Barenthin |
| Preceded by Generalleutnant Hans Kroh | Commander of 2. Fallschirmjäger-Division; 1 June 1944 – 11 August 1944 | Succeeded by Generalleutnant Hans Kroh |
