= 2nd Parachute Division =

German WWII airborne division

- German: 2. Fallschirmjäger-Division
- Unit insignia
- Active: 1943–45
- Country: Germany
- Branch: Luftwaffe
- Type: Fallschirmjäger
- Size: Division
- Engagements: World War II: Odessa Offensive

Commanders
- Notable commanders: Hermann-Bernhard Ramcke

The 2nd Parachute Division (German: 2. Fallschirmjäger-Division) was an airborne division of the German Luftwaffe of the Wehrmacht during World War II.

== Formation ==
The 2nd Parachute Division was raised in 1943, with the 2nd Parachute Regiment, recently detached from the 1st Parachute Division, serving as its nucleus.

== Operational history ==
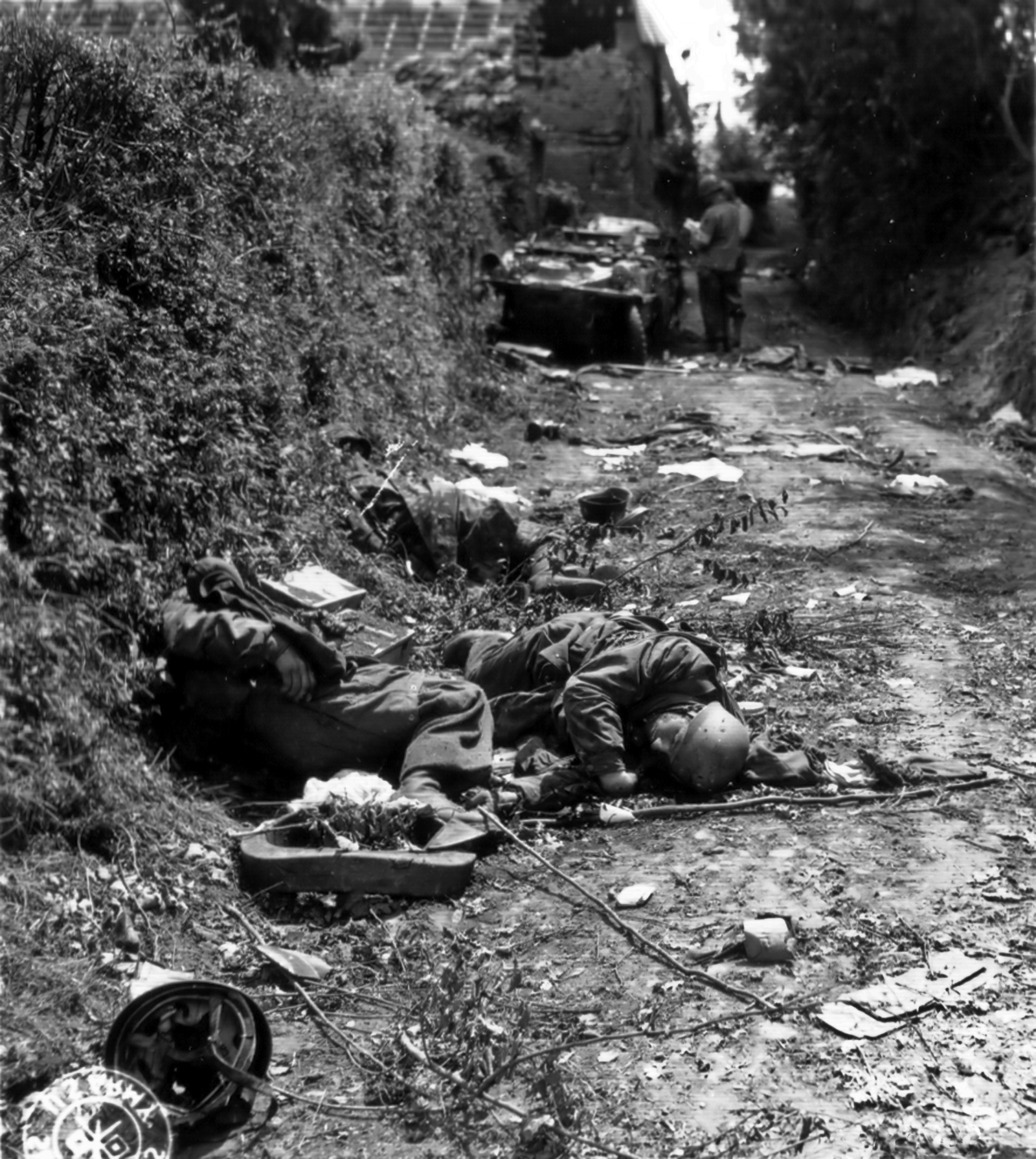
A destroyed convoy from the 6th Regiment being examined by American troops in Normandy, July 1944

In May, the division was sent to Avignon in France, where it became part of the XI Flieger Corps along with the 1st Parachute Division. This Corps served as the reserve for the German 10th Army in Italy.

When the Italian government started to crumble in September, the 2nd Parachute Division was dispatched to Italy. It carried out coastal defense duties near the Tiber estuary. The men moved to Rome in the evening of September 8 and participated in a subsequent operation to capture the Italian Army defeating a large assembly of infantry and armoured troops that in Porta San Paolo tried to stop them. The 1st Battalion of the 2nd Parachute Regiment participated in the capture of Leros Island in the Dodecanese. The island was then still occupied by Italian forces supplemented by British units following the surrender of Italy. By November 16, the island was retaken by German forces.

In October 1943, the division was deployed to the Eastern Front in the Soviet Union and was subordinated to the 42nd Army Corps, west of Kiev. On December 15, the division was airlifted south toward Kirovograd to contain a Soviet breakout. A German counter-attack then commenced against heavy opposition. By December 23, the attack faltered and the division returned to the defensive. In January 1944, the division remained on the Eastern Front, successfully opposing the Soviet offensive around Kirovograd. The Soviet advance resumed in March causing the division to retreat behind the Bug River. The division fought its last actions on the Eastern Front in May during a counterattack against a Red Army bridgehead across the Dniestr river. At the end of May the weakened division was pulled from the line and returned to Germany for refit, during which time was supplied with more than 1000 FG 42 automatic rifles as part of a new program to equip the paratrooper divisions, although only the 2nd Parachute Division would have the weapon in large numbers. The division was sent to garrison the northern French area.

During the Allied D-Day landings on June 6, 1944, the 6th Regiment was stationed in the Carentan area of the Cotentin Peninsula, near the US 101st Airborne Division's drop zones. The regiment was heavily engaged in the subsequent battles, including at Saint-Lô. On June 13 the remainder of the division was transferred to Brest in western France. In July, the surviving elements of the 6th Regiment were caught in the Falaise Pocket and destroyed during the Allied advance. By August 9 the remainder of the division was driven back and cut off in the city of Brest, where it surrendered on September 20. A new division was formed by December; it fought in the defense of Germany in January 1945 and ended the war in the Ruhr Pocket in April. Parts of the already depleted division managed to break out from the Ruhr Pocket and was absorbed by the 6th Parachute Division in mid April.

== War crimes ==
The division has been implicated in a number of war crimes in Italy between September and October 1943, as follows:

- Rome (16 and 23 September, 7 and 23 October)
- Palidoro (23 September, shooting of Salvo D'Acquisto and 1 October, shooting of 3 civilians)
- Tolfa (10 October, shooting of 12 civilians)
- Mentana (27 October, shooting of 25 civilians and 4 British former prisoners of war)
- Bieda di Vetralla (29 October, shooting of 14 civilians)

== Commanders ==
Date	Commander
February 2, 1943	Generalmajor Hermann-Bernhard Ramcke
September 13, 1943	Generalmajor Walter Barenthin
November 14, 1943	Generalleutnant Gustav Wilke
March 17, 1944	Generalmajor Hans Kroh
June 1, 1944	General Hermann-Bernhard Ramcke
August 11, 1944	Generalmajor Hans Kroh
November 15, 1944	Generalleutnant Walter Lackner
