= Hans von der Mosel =

WW2 German Army general (1898-1969)

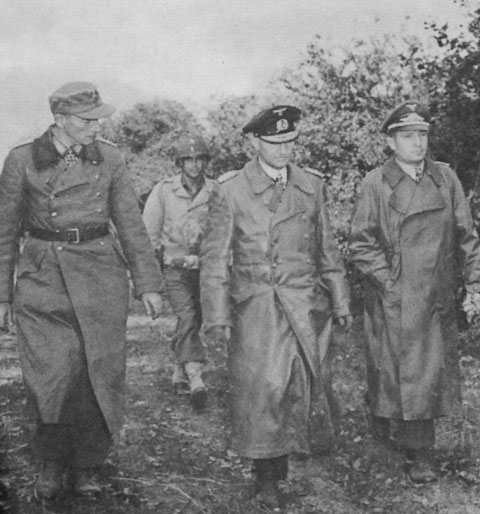
- Mosel (left), Konteradmiral Otto Kähler (center) and General Hans Kroh (right) surrender at Brest, France, 18 September 1944
- Born: 3 May 1898
- Died: 12 April 1969 (aged 70)
- Military career
- Allegiance: German Empire; Weimar Republic; Nazi Germany
- Branch: Army
- Service years: 1916–1945
- Rank: Generalmajor
- Conflicts: World War II
- Awards: Knight's Cross of the Iron Cross with Oak Leaves

Hans von der Mosel (3 May 1898 – 12 April 1969) was a general in the Wehrmacht of Nazi Germany during World War II. He was a recipient of the Knight's Cross of the Iron Cross with Oak Leaves. Mosel surrendered to American forces on 19 September 1944 after the fall of Brest.

== Awards and decorations ==
- Iron Cross (1914) 2nd Class (12 August 1918)
- Honour Cross of the World War 1914/1918
- Clasp to the Iron Cross (1939) 2nd Class (24 December 1940) & 1st Class (25 July 1941)
- Knight's Cross of the Iron Cross with Oak Leaves
  - Knight's Cross on 9 August 1942 as Oberst and commander of Grenadier-Regiment 548
  - 589th Oak Leaves on 18 September 1944 as Generalmajor and Chief of staff of the fortress Brest (France)
