= 1st Luftwaffe Field Division =

German military unit

1st Luftwaffe Field Division (1. Luftwaffen-Feld-Division)
- Active: 1942–1944
- Country: Nazi Germany
- Branch: Luftwaffe
- Type: Infantry
- Size: Division
- Engagements: World War II; Eastern Front; Leningrad–Novgorod Offensive

The 1st Luftwaffe Field Division (German: 1. Luftwaffen-Feld-Division) was an infantry division of the Luftwaffe branch of the Wehrmacht that fought in World War II. It was formed using surplus ground crew of the Luftwaffe in Konigsberg, East Prussia. It served on the Northern Sector of the Eastern Front under Army Group North from late 1942 to early 1944 at which time it was disbanded.

== Operational history ==
The 1st Luftwaffe Field Division, the first of several such divisions, was formed in mid-1942 in Königsberg, Eastern Prussia, under the command of Oberst (Note: The rank of Oberst is equivalent to that of colonel in the United States Army.) Gustav Wilke. Intended to serve as infantry, its personnel were largely drawn from surplus Luftwaffe (German Air Force) ground crew. Infantry recruits came from Flieger-Regiment 10, a cadre regiment under the command of Oberst Robert Pistorius. The division included four battalions of infantry, as well as artillery, anti-tank, engineer and signal units although it lacked regimental staff. After training was completed in December 1942 it was sent to Army Group North as part of Georg Lindemann's 18th Army although still under Luftwaffe command. Stationed near Novgorod, it was transferred to the Army in December 1943. The division saw little fighting until the withdrawal from Leningrad in January 1944 during which it was involved in heavy defensive battles north of Novgorod.

The division's personnel were inadequately trained for its role as infantry and due to the heavy losses incurred in the Soviet attacks of the 1943/1944 winter, (Note: Some 1,300 personnel were killed or wounded in the Soviet Leningrad-Novgorod offensive.) the division itself was disbanded shortly afterwards. Its surviving personnel were absorbed by the 28th Jager Division.

== Commanders ==
The following officers were commanders of the 1st Luftwaffe Field Division: (Note: Ranks stated are those at the time of taking command.)

- Oberst Gustav Wilke (30 September 1942 – 16 January 1943; 14 April – 14 June 1943; 23 July — 30 September 1943);
- Generalmajor (Note: The rank of generalmajor is equivalent to that of brigadier general in the United States Army.) Werner Zech (17 January – 13 April 1943);
- Oberst Anton Longin (15 June – 22 July 1943);
- Generalmajor Rudolf Petrauschke (1 October 1943 – February 1944).

== War commentary ==
At least 680 graves of soldiers of the 1st Luftwaffe Field Division are found at the war cemetery in Veliky Novgorod, where a total of 11.400 German and Spanish soldiers are buried.

== Notes ==
Footnotes

Citations
