= Ludwig Heilmann =

WW2 Luftwaffe general (1903-1959)

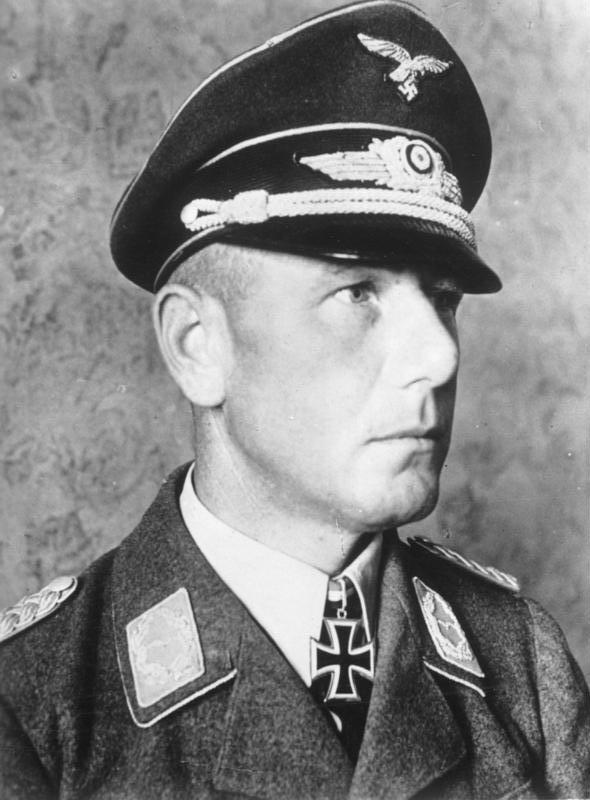
- Born: 9 August 1903; Würzburg, German Empire
- Died: 26 October 1959 (aged 56); Kempten, West Germany
- Military career
- Allegiance: Weimar Republic; Nazi Germany
- Branch: Reichsheer; Army; Luftwaffe
- Service years: 1921–33, 1934–45
- Rank: Generalmajor
- Commands: 5th Parachute Division
- Conflicts: World War II
- Awards: Knight's Cross of the Iron Cross with Oak Leaves and Swords

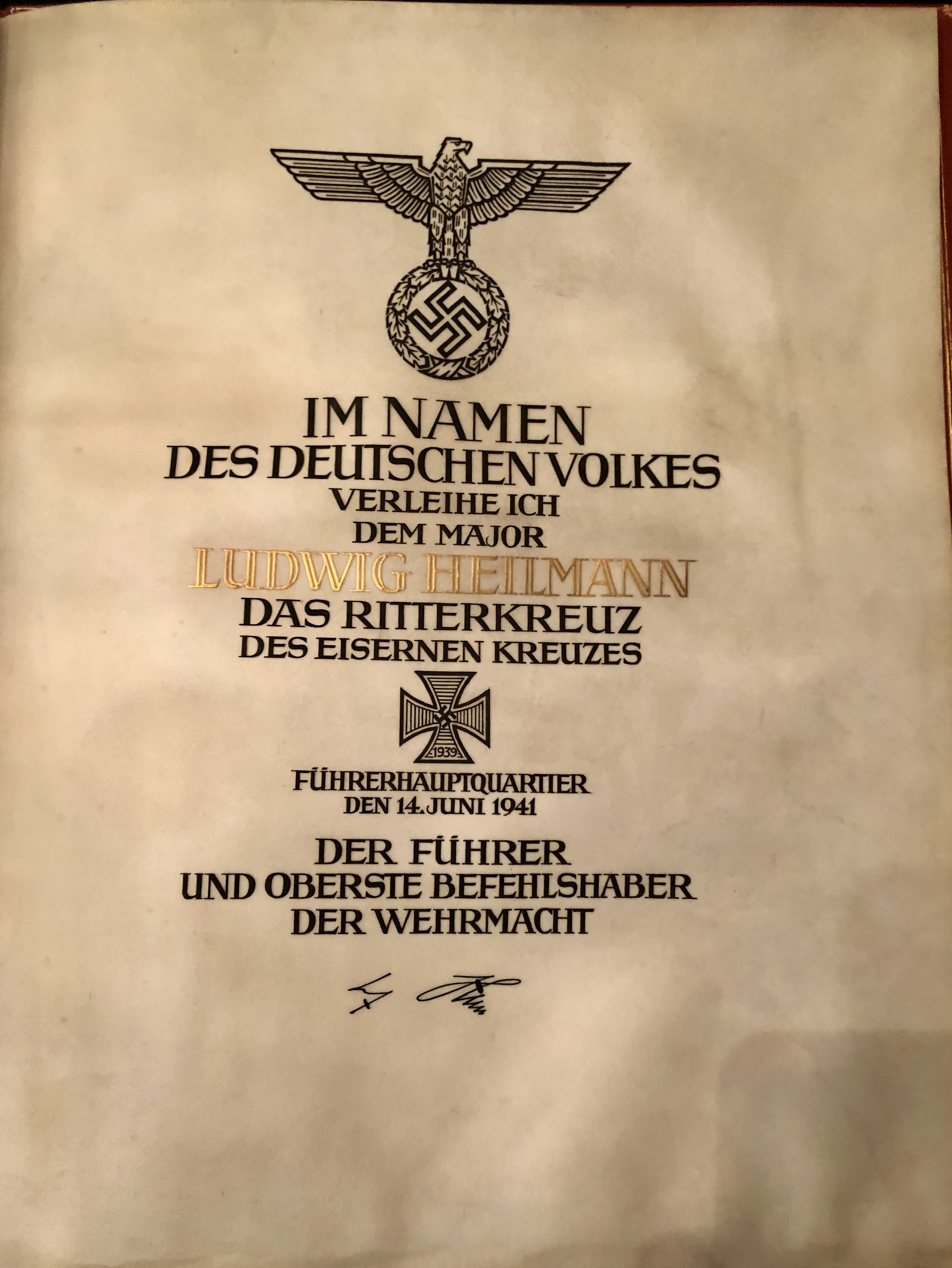
Knights Cross of the Iron Cross Citation awarded to Ludwig Heilmann on 14 June 1941.

Ludwig Heilmann (9 August 1903 – 26 October 1959) was a German paratroop general in the Wehrmacht during World War II. He was a recipient of the Knight's Cross of the Iron Cross with Oak Leaves and Swords.

== Awards ==
- Wehrmacht Long Service Award 4th and 3rd Class (2 October 1936)
- Iron Cross (1939) 2nd Class (2 October 1939) & 1st Class (14 June 1941)
- German Cross in Gold on 26 February 1942 as Major in the III./Fallschirmjäger-Regiment 3
- Knight's Cross of the Iron Cross with Oak Leaves and Swords
  - Knight's Cross on 14 June 1941 as Major and commander of the III./Fallschirmjäger-Regiment 3
  - 412th Oak Leaves on 2 March 1944 as Oberst and commander of Fallschirmjäger-Regiment 3
  - 67th Swords on 15 May 1944 as Oberst and commander of Fallschirmjäger-Regiment 3

Military offices
Preceded by Generalleutnant Gustav Wilke	Commander of 5th Fallschirmjäger-Division; 15 October 1944 – 21 March 1945	Succeeded by Kurt Gröschke
