= Gustav Wilke =

- Born: 6 March 1898; Deutsch-Eylau, West Prussia, German Empire
- Died: 14 March 1977 (aged 79); Oberstdorf, West Germany
- Military career
- Allegiance: German Empire; Weimar Republic; Nazi Germany
- Branch: Prussian Army; Reichswehr; Luftwaffe
- Service years: 1916–1920; 1925–1945
- Rank: Generalleutnant
- Conflicts: World War I World War II
- Awards: Knight's Cross of the Iron Cross

Gustav Wilke (6 March 1898 – 14 March 1977) was a German paratroop general during World War II. He was a recipient of the Knight's Cross of the Iron Cross of Nazi Germany.

== Awards ==
- Knight's Cross of the Iron Cross on 24 May 1940 as Oberstleutnant and Gruppenkommandeur of Kampfgruppe z.b.V. 11

Military offices
Preceded by None	Commander of 1. Luftwaffen-Feld-Division; 30 September 1942 – 31 October 1943	Succeeded by Generalmajor Rudolf Petrauschke
Preceded by Generalmajor Walter Barenthin	Commander of 2. Fallschirmjäger-Division; 14 November 1943 – 17 March 1944	Succeeded by Generalmajor Hans Kroh
Preceded by None	Commander of 5. Fallschirmjäger-Division; 1 April 1944 - 23 September 1944	Succeeded by Generalmajor Sebastian-Ludwig Heilmann
Preceded by None	Commander of 9. Fallschirmjäger-Division; 24 September 1944 – 10 March 1945	Succeeded by General der Fallschirmtruppe Bruno Bräuer
Preceded by None	Commander of 10. Fallschirmjäger-Division; 10 March 1945 – 5 May 1945	Succeeded by None
