= 5th Parachute Division =

German WWII airborne division

- German: 5. Fallschirmjäger-Division
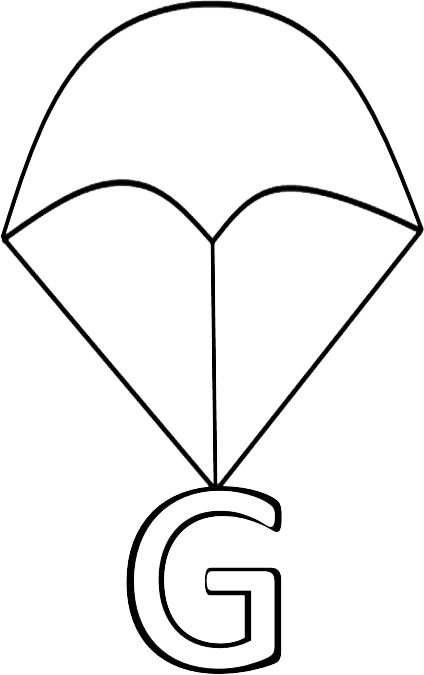
- Unit insignia
- Active: 1 April 1944–April 1945
- Country: Germany
- Branch: Luftwaffe
- Type: Fallschirmjäger
- Role: Airborne forces
- Size: Division
- Engagements: World War II; Western Front (World War II); Operation Overlord; Battle of the Bulge; Western Allied invasion of Germany; Ruhr Pocket

Commanders
- Notable commanders: Gustav Wilke; Sebastian-Ludwig Heilmann

The 5th Parachute Division (German: 5. Fallschirmjäger-Division) was a Fallschirmjäger (paratroop) division in the German air force (Luftwaffe) during the Second World War, active from 1944 to 1945.

== Operational history ==
The 5th Parachute Division was formed in France in early 1944, commanded by Gustav Wilke and was the last division to receive near full fallschirmjäger training. It contained the 13th, 14th and 15th Fallschirmjäger Regiments, and the 5th Fallschirmjäger Artillery Regiment.

Only the 15th Regiment was ready during the Battle of Normandy and was attached to 17th SS Panzergrenadier Division in the early stages of the campaign. The rest of the division was slowly committed later in July. It took heavy losses during the campaign and was subsequently withdrawn to the Netherlands to rebuild and refit.

The division took part in the Battle of the Bulge. After withdrawing through Germany, part of the division surrendered near the Nürburgring in mid-March 1945, the rest of the division surrendered in the Ruhr Pocket in April.

== Commanding officer ==
- Generalleutnant Gustav Wilke, 1 April 1944 – 23 September 1944
- Generalmajor Sebastian-Ludwig Heilmann, 23 September 1944 – 12 March 1945
- Oberst Kurt Gröschke, 12 March 1945 – April 1945
