= Operation Stösser =

Military operation

- Part of the Battle of the Bulge during World War II
Date	17 December 1944
Location	High Fens, Ardennes 50°30′40″N 6°04′40″E
Result	German operational failure

Belligerents
Germany	United States

Commanders and leaders
Friedrich August Freiherr von der Heydte (POW)	George A. Smith (Jr.)

Units involved
1,200–1,300 Fallschirmjäger	18th Infantry Regiment

Casualties and losses
Unknown	Unknown

Operation Stösser (English: Operation Hawk) was a paratroop drop into the American rear in the High Fens area during the Battle of the Bulge in World War II. Its objective was to take and hold the crossroads at Belle-Croix Jalhay N-68 - N-672 until the arrival of the 12th SS Panzer Division. Both roads were main supply routes, the N-68 Eupen and the N-672 Verviers up to Belle-Croix leads to either Malmedy or Elsenborn. The operation was led by Oberst Friedrich August Freiherr von der Heydte, who was given eight days to prepare the mission. The majority of the Fallschirmjäger (paratroopers) and pilots assigned to the operation were undertrained and inexperienced. Kampfgruppe Von Der Heydte took up a position at Porfays in the forest east of the N-68 and conducted some local skirmishes on small US convoys and even captured some POWs. The mission was a failure.

== Background ==
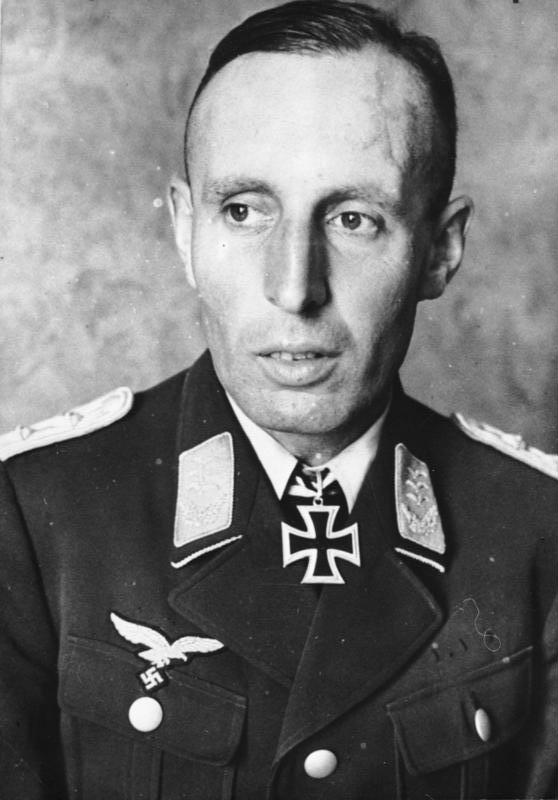
Friedrich August Freiherr von der Heydte commanded the operation

Friedrich August Freiherr von der Heydte, a seasoned paratroop commander and veteran of the airborne assault on Crete, was summoned on 8 December and told to prepare for a mission, but not given any details. Heydte was given eight days to prepare. He wanted to use his own regiment, but this was forbidden because its movement might alert the Allies to the impending counterattack. Instead, he was provided with a Kampfgruppe of 800 men. The II Parachute Corps was tasked with contributing 100 men from each of its regiments. Instead of contributing their best men as ordered, the regiments sent their misfits and troublemakers. Heydte could not afford to resist too strongly. A cousin of Claus von Stauffenberg, a central figure in the July 20, 1944 assassination attempt on Hitler, he was under scrutiny.

In loyalty to their command, 150 men from Heydte's own unit, the 6th Parachute Regiment, disobeyed orders and joined him. To avoid alerting the Allied forces, the German command planned to conduct the drop without first conducting reconnaissance or taking aerial photographs.

== Lack of training ==
The men had little time to establish unit cohesion or train together. Many of the men assigned to Heydte had never jumped out of an airplane before. Heydte later commented, "Never in my entire career had I been in command of a unit with less fighting spirit."

On 13 December, Heydte visited the headquarters of Army Group B near Bad Münstereifel to complain that the resources allocated to him for the operation were wholly inadequate. Field Marshal Walter Model, who had tried to persuade Hitler to attempt a less ambitious counterattack, replied that he gave the entire Ardennes Offensive less than a 10 percent chance of succeeding. Model told him it was necessary to make the attempt: "It must be done because this offensive is the last chance to conclude the war favorably."

== Assault delay and mis-drops ==
The drop was delayed for a day when the assigned aircraft did not show up. The new drop time was set for 03:00 on 17 December; the drop zone was 7 miles (11 km) north of Malmedy. Their objective was to seize the crossroads and hold it for approximately twenty-four hours until relieved by the 12th SS Panzer Division, hampering the flow of Allied reinforcements and supplies in the area.

Just after midnight on 17 December, 112 Ju 52 transport planes with around 1,300 paratroops took off during a powerful snowstorm with strong winds and considerable low cloud cover. The Luftwaffe was short of experienced pilots. Many of the pilots had never flown the Ju 52 before, half had never flown in combat, nor were they trained to conduct drops at night or to fly in formation. Pathfinders from the Nachtschlachtgruppe 20 were supposed to lead the way, but the pilots were so inexperienced that they flew with their navigation lights on.

Many planes went off course. Two hundred and fifty men were dropped near Bonn, 50 miles (80 km) from the intended drop zone. Some landed with their troops still on board. Strong winds deflected many paratroops whose planes were relatively close to the intended drop zone and made their landings far rougher. Only a fraction of the force landed near the intended drop zone. Since many of the German paratroops were very inexperienced, some were crippled upon impact and died where they fell. Some were found the following spring when the snow melted.

== Confusion among Americans ==
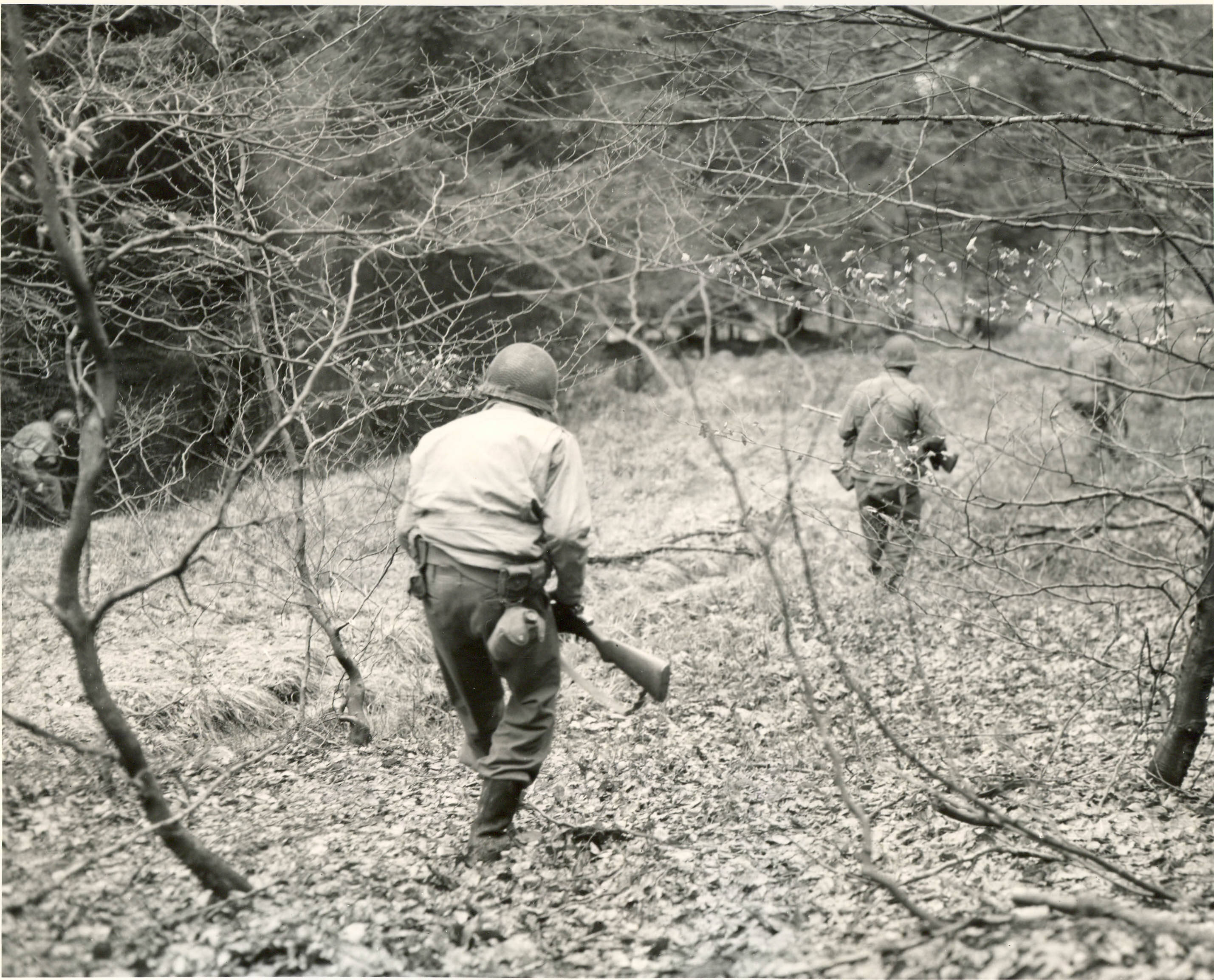
A patrol of Company F, 3rd Battalion, 18th Infantry Regiment, 1st Infantry Division, searches the woods between Eupen and Butgenbach, Belgium, for German parachutists

Because of the extensive dispersal of the drop, Fallschirmjäger were reported all over the Ardennes, and the Allies believed a major division-sized jump had taken place, causing the Americans much confusion and convincing them to allocate men to secure the rear instead of facing the main German thrust at the front. An entire U.S. infantry regiment of 3000 men (U.S. 18th Infantry) along with an armored combat command of 300 tanks and 2,000 men searched several days for the German force.

By noon on 17 December, Heydte's unit had scouted the woods and rounded up a total of around 300 troops. With only enough ammunition for a single fight, the force was too small to take the crossroads on its own. Heydte first planned to wait for the arrival of the 12th SS Panzer Division when they would suddenly seize the crossroads just before their arrival. The 12th SS Panzer Division, unable to defeat the Americans at the Battle of Elsenborn Ridge, never arrived. After three days of waiting, he abandoned these revised plans and instead converted his mission to reconnaissance. Oberstgruppenführer Sepp Dietrich had scoffed at Heydte's request for carrier pigeons, and none of the unit's radios survived the drop, so he was unable to report the detailed information he gathered.

== Withdrawal to Germany ==
With only a single day's food supply and limited water, on 19 December Heydte withdrew his forces towards the German lines. He used their limited ammunition to attack the rear of the American lines. Only about one-third reached the German rear. Heydte, wounded, frostbitten, and suffering from pneumonia, knocked on doors in Monschau until he found a German family. The next morning he sent a boy with a surrender note to the Allies. He was taken prisoner on 23 December and remained in custody until 1947.
