= Ramcke Parachute Brigade =

Fallschirmjäger-Brigade Afrika; Fallschirmjäger-Brigade Ramcke; Luftwaffen-Jäger-Brigade 1
- Active: 1942–1943
- Country: Nazi Germany
- Branch: Luftwaffe
- Type: Airborne forces
- Size: Brigade
- Engagements: Western Desert Campaign; Tunisia Campaign

Commanders
- Commander: Hermann-Bernhard Ramcke

The Ramcke Parachute Brigade was a Luftwaffe airborne forces (Fallschirmjäger) brigade which saw action in the Mediterranean Theatre during World War II.

== Operational history ==
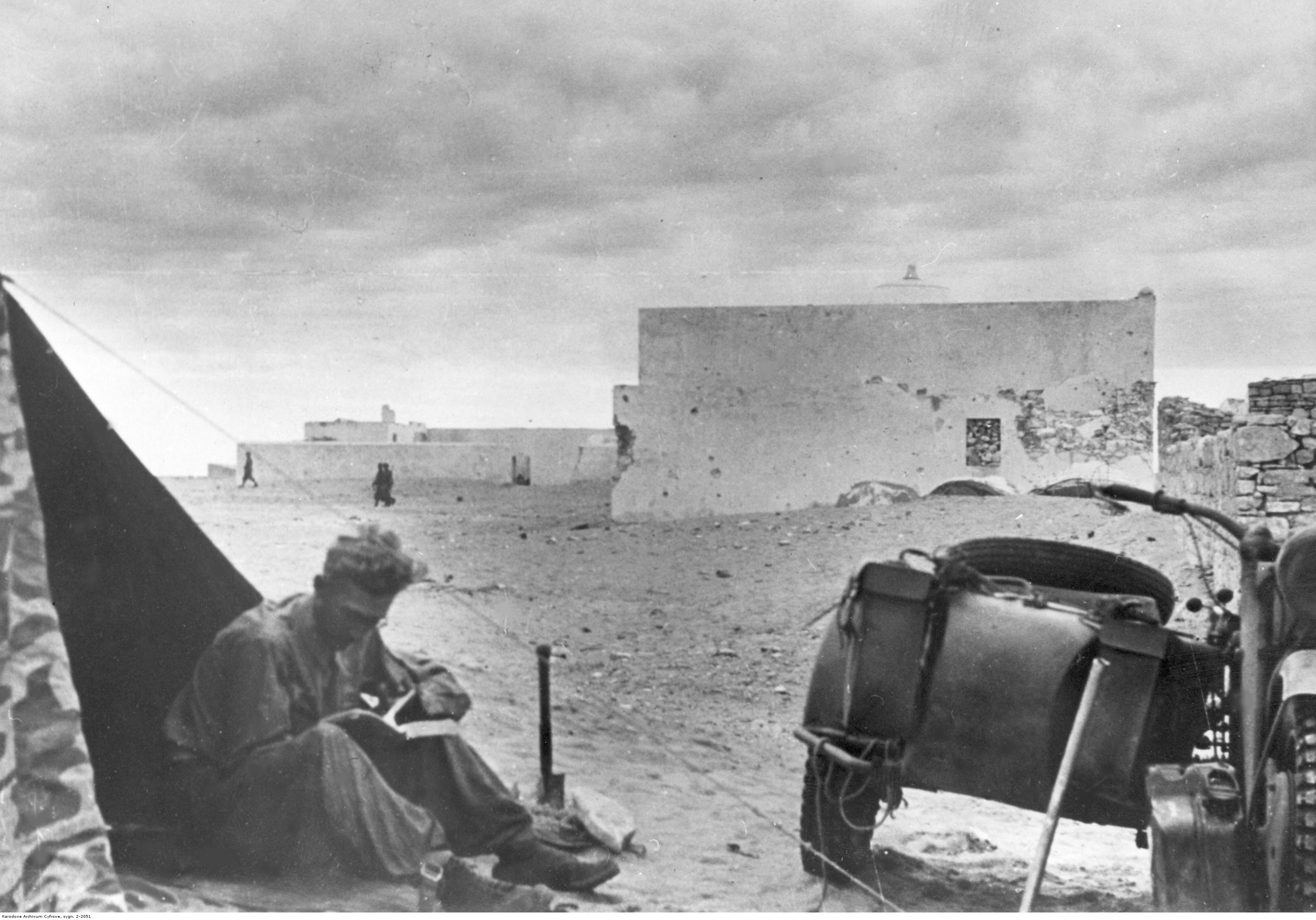
Ramcke brigade paratroopers in North Africa, January 1943

The brigade was formed in 1942 and sent to join the Afrika Korps in North Africa. Ramcke's unit fought during the Afrika Korps's assault towards the Suez Canal, fighting alongside the Italian 25 Infantry Division Bologna before British opposition solidified near the town of El Alamein. The British action resulted in the separation of the Brigade, unable to move as fast as the battle lines due to insufficient transportation. Taking heavy losses (about 450) fighting surrounded on all sides, they captured a British supply convoy carrying food and fuel, about which Ramcke later remarked the most welcome surprise was the tobacco and luxury goods. Using those trucks, about 600 survivors returned to German lines.

The brigade was then engaged in the retreat into Tunisia. Ramcke was transferred back to Germany where he was awarded the Oak Leaves to the Knight's Cross, and command passed to Major Hans Kroh. The remaining brigade was part of the capitulation of German Panzer Army Afrika in May 1943.

== Organization ==
Structure of the brigade in October of 1942:

- Headquarters under Generalmajor Hermann-Bernhard Ramcke
  - 1st Battalion, 2nd Parachute Regiment
  - 1st Battalion, 3rd Parachute Regiment
  - 2nd Battalion, 5th Parachute Regiment
  - 4th Parachute Training Battalion
  - 2nd Battalion, 7th Parachute Artillery Regiment
  - A Company, 7th Tank Destroyer Battalion
  - 2nd Company, Parachute Pioneer Battalion
  - A Parachute Signal Platoon
  - A Medical Company

== Commanders ==
- Generalleutnant (later General der Fallschirmtruppen) Hermann-Bernhard Ramcke (1 April 1942 - 18 November 1942)
- Oberstleutnant Hans Kroh (18 November 1942 - 18 February 1943)
