= 10th Parachute Division (Germany) =

German WWII airborne division

- German: 10. Fallschirmjäger-Division
- Active: March 1945
- Disbanded: May 1945
- Country: Germany
- Branch: Luftwaffe
- Type: Fallschirmjäger
- Role: Airborne force
- Size: Division
- Engagements: World War II

Commanders
- Notable commanders: Gustav Wilke

The 10th Parachute Division (German: 10. Fallschirmjäger-Division) was a division of the German military during the Second World War, active in 1945. Officially designated an airborne division, it was in fact unable to carryout airborne operations and was thus an infantry formation.

The division was formed in March 1945 out of a disparate collection of Luftwaffe units, including existing parachute units in the Italian theatre and crews from Jagdgeschwader 101, and commanded by Gustav Wilke. It contained the 28th, 29th and 30th Fallschirmjäger Regiments, and the 10th Fallschirmjäger Artillery Regiment.

The division fought in Austria and Moravia, surrendering to the Soviet Army in May 1945 at the end of the war.
