= Hans Kroh =

Nazi general (1907–1967)

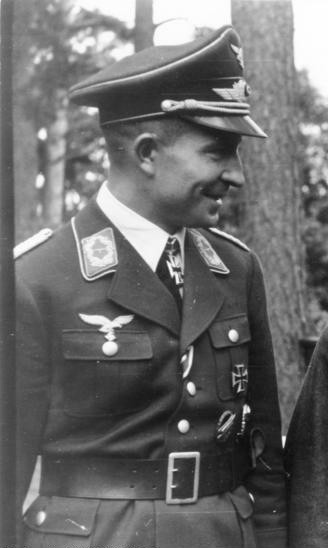
- Born: 13 May 1907; Heidelberg, German Empire
- Died: 18 July 1967 (aged 60); Braunschweig, West Germany
- Military career
- Allegiance: Nazi Germany; West Germany
- Branch: Luftwaffe; German Army
- Service years: 1935–1945; 1956–1962
- Rank: Generalmajor (Wehrmacht / Bundeswehr)
- Commands: 2nd Parachute Division
- Conflicts: World War II; Battle of Crete; Battle for Brest
- Awards: Knight's Cross of the Iron Cross with Oak Leaves and Swords; Great Cross of Merit

Hans Kroh (13 May 1907 – 18 July 1967) was a German paratroop general in the Wehrmacht and Bundeswehr and a recipient of the Knight's Cross of the Iron Cross with Oak Leaves and Swords of Nazi Germany.

Kroh started his military career in 1935; he transferred to the Luftwaffe in 1936. He took part in the Battle of Crete for which he received the Knight's Cross of the Iron Cross on 21 August 1941. In Africa, Kroh served in the Ramcke Parachute Brigade. Kroh commanded the 2nd Parachute Division in the Battle for Brest; he was taken prisoner on 18 September 1944. Kroh was released from custody in 1948 and joined the Bundeswehr in 1956 as Oberst. In 1957 he was promoted to Brigadegeneral and appointed a divisional commander. He retired in 1962 at the rank of Generalmajor. Kroh died in 1967.

== Awards ==
- Iron Cross 2nd Class (22 May 1940) & 1st Class (22 May 1940)
- Medaglia d'Argento al Valor Militare (9 February 1942)
- German Cross in Gold on 24 December 1942 as Major in the I./Lw.Jg.Brig. 1
- Knight's Cross of the Iron Cross with Oak Leaves and Swords
  - Knight's Cross on 21 August 1941 as Major and commander I./Fallschirmjäger-Regiment 2
  - 443rd Oak Leaves on 6 April 1944 as Oberstleutnant and commander of the Fallschirmjäger-Regiment 2
  - 96th Schwerter on 12 September 1944 as Oberst and leader of the 2. Fallschirmjäger-Division
- Great Cross of Merit (12 September 1962)

Military offices
Preceded by Generalleutnant Gustav Wilke	Commander of 2. Fallschirmjäger-Division (Wehrmacht); 17 March 1944 – 1 June 1944	Succeeded by General Hermann-Bernhard Ramcke
Preceded by General Hermann-Bernhard Ramcke	Commander of 2. Fallschirmjäger-Division (Wehrmacht); 11 August 1944 – 18 September 1944	Succeeded by Generalleutnant Walter Lackner
Preceded by Oberst Bern von Baer	Commander of the 1. Luftlande-Division (Bundeswehr); September 1957 – 30 September 1962	Succeeded by Generalmajor Walter Gericke
