= 1915 Birthday Honours =

Appointments by King George V

The 1915 Birthday Honours were appointments by King George V to various orders and honours to reward and highlight good works by citizens of the British Empire. The appointments were made to celebrate the official birthday of The King, and were published in The London Gazette and in The Times on 3 June 1915.

Many of the honours were awarded for efforts in the war. The Times noted, "The lists of Honours conferred on the occasion of the King's Birthday reflect the mood of the time, and contain, for the most part, the names of those who have been engaged in forwarding the national cause, in one way or another." A second list of birthday honours "for services rendered in connection with military operations in the field" was released on 23 June, with appointments to date from 3 June. The list included nine recipients of the Victoria Cross, the highest and most prestigious award for gallantry in the face of the enemy that can be awarded to British and Commonwealth forces. Four of the recipients of the Victoria Cross were killed in actions and received the honour posthumously.

The recipients of honours are displayed here as they were styled before their new honour, and arranged by honour, with classes (Knight, Knight Grand Cross, etc.) and then divisions (Military, Civil, etc.) as appropriate.

== United Kingdom and British Empire ==
=== Baron ===
- The Rt. Hon. Sir Francis Bertie GCB GCMG GCVO, British Ambassador in Paris since 1905.
- Sir Kenneth Muir-Mackenzie KCB KC, Permanent Principal Secretary to the Lord Chancellor since 1890 and Clerk of the Crown in Chancery.

=== Privy Councillor ===
The King appointed the following to His Majesty's Most Honourable Privy Council:

- Lord Robert Cecil KC MP
- Sir John Newell Jordan GCIE KCB KCMG
- Francis Dyke Acland MP
- Harold Trevor Baker MP
- George Cave KC MP
- Henry Edward Duke KC MP
- John Mackinnon Robertson MP

=== Baronetcies ===
- Frank Bowden of Nottingham; chairman of the Raleigh Cycle Company.
- Arthur Henry Crosfield MP. Served as Member of Parliament for Warrington from 1900 to 1910.
- Edward Alfred Goulding MP. Elected Member of Parliament for Worcester in 1908.
- Robert Park Lyle, For public services as a member of the Royal Commission on Sugar Supplies.
- Sir Henry Norman KP MP. Liberal Member of Parliament for South Wolverhampton and for Blackburn from 1910 to the present time.
- Sir Gilbert Parker MP. Novelist and Honorary Colonel of the Kent Royal Garrison Artillery. Conservative Member of Parliament for Gravesend.

=== Knight Bachelor ===
- Henry Francis Doran, member of the Congested Districts Board for Ireland.
- Honorary Commander Edward Lionel Fletcher RNR. Joint manager of the White Star Line; contributed valuable services to the transport of the Expeditionary Force.
- Lieutenant-Colonel William Forbes, Commandant, Engineer and Railway Staff Corps, General Manager of the London, Brighton and South Coast Railway.
- Charles Edward Fryer ISO, Superintending Inspector of Fisheries, Board of Agriculture. Officer of the Legion of Honour, and an Officer of the Order of Leopold and of the Order of Dannebrog.
- Joseph A. Glynn, Chairman, National Health Insurance Commission (Ireland).
- Henry Ledgard, of Cawnpore.
- John Lindsay. Formerly Clerk to the Glasgow Corporation (Police Department), afterwards Senior Town Clerk Deputy, and subsequently Town Clerk.
- Charles Stewart Loch. Former Secretary of the Charity Organization Society; member of the Royal Commission on the Aged Poor, and subsequently served on the Royal Commission on the Care and Control of the Feeble-Minded and the Poor Law Commission.
- James Mackenzie FRS FRCP . Heart specialist and lecturer on cardiac research at the London Hospital, and author of many works on diseases of the heart.
- John Henry Maden MP, High Sheriff of Lancashire. From 1892 to 1908 he was a Liberal Member of Parliament for the Rossendale Division.
- The Hon. Peter McBride, Agent-General in London for the State of Victoria.
- Leo George Chiozza Money MP. Liberal member for Paddington North and East Northamptonshire; author and authority on economic and fiscal subjects.
- Ruthven Grey Monteath, of Calcutta.
- James Murray MP. One of the Trustees of the Scottish National Galleries. He served as a Liberal member of Parliament for East Aberdeenshire from 1906 to 1910, when he retired in 1910 because of ill-health.
- Frederick Needham, Commissioner, Board of Control, Commissioner in Lunacy.
- Walter P. Nevill, London stockbroker whose advice on matters connected with the Stock Exchange since the outbreak of the war has been of great service to the Treasury.
- Erik Olof Ohlson, of Hull, for valuable assistance to the Foreign Office since the outbreak of war.
- William Pearce MP. He was a member of the London County Council from 1892 to 1900; Member of Parliament for the Limehouse Division of Tower Hamlets as a Liberal since 1906. Director of William Pearce and Sons, Ltd. and Spencer Chapman and Mensel (Limited), chemical manufacturers.
- Edward Rigg CB ISO, Superintendent, Operative Department, Royal Mint.
- Edward George Saltmarsh, Former president of the London Corn Trade Association and served on various War Committees.
- William Napier Shaw FRS, Director of the Meteorological Office.
- William Capel Slaughter. Solicitor and founder of Slaughter and May; has served as a member of the Royal Commission on Sugar Supplies and has been helpful in other capacities to the Board of Trade.
- William Slingo, Engineer-in-Chief, General Post Office.

Colonies, Protectorates, etc.

- Herbert Brown Ames, Member of the House of Commons of Canada, Honorary Secretary of the Canadian Patriotic Fund.
- The Hon. Edgar Rennie Bowring, Member of the Legislative Council of Newfoundland.
- Henry Lumley Drayton KC, Chief Commissioner, Board of Railway Commissioners for Canada.
- John Craig Eaton, of Toronto.
- Charles Frederick Fraser, Superintendent of the School for the Blind, Halifax, Canada.
- Robert Hotung, of Hong Kong.
- The Hon. Thomas Hughes, Member of the Legislative Council of the State of New South Wales.
- Thomas Muir CMG , Superintendent-General of Education, Province of the Cape of Good Hope, Union of South Africa-
- Alexander Wood Renton, the Chief Justice of the Island of Ceylon.

British India

- Rash Behari Ghosh CSI CIE, of Calcutta.
- John George Woodroffe, a Puisne Judge of the High Court of Judicature at Fort William, in Bengal.
- Rabindranath Tagore, of Bolpur, Bengal.
- Robert Richard Gales, Indian Public Works Department.
- Haji Muhammad Yusuf, of Bombay.

=== The Most Noble Order of the Garter ===
==== Knight of the Garter (KG) ====
- Field Marshal The Rt. Hon. Sir Horatio Herbert, Earl Kitchener of Khartoum KP GCB OM GCSI GCMG GCIE

=== The Most Honourable Order of the Bath ===
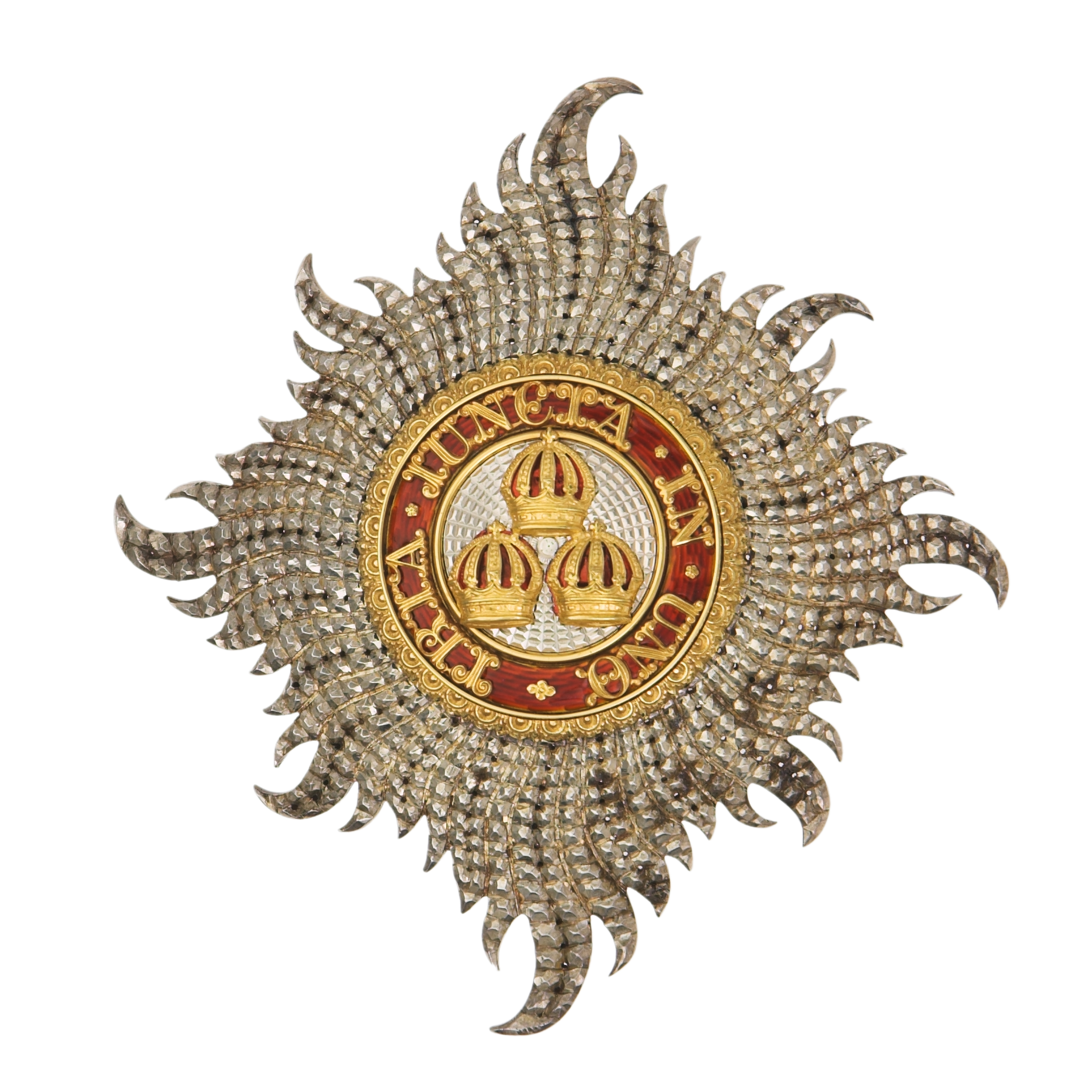
Civilian star of the Knight Grand Cross of the Order of the Bath

==== Knight Grand Cross of the Order of the Bath (GCB) ====
Military Division
Army

- General Sir Douglas Haig KCB KCIE KCVO ADC, General, Colonel, 17th (Duke of Cambridge's Own) Lancers.
- General Sir Bruce Meade Hamilton KCB KCVO, Commanding 1st Army, Central Force.

Civil Division

- The Rt. Hon. Sir George William Buchanan GCMG GCVO CB, His Majesty's Ambassador, Petrograd.
- The Rt. Hon. Sir Rufus Daniel, Baron Reading KCVO

==== Knight Commander of the Order of the Bath (KCB) ====
Military Division
Army

- Lieutenant-General Edward Cecil Bethune CVO CB Colonel, 4th Dragoon Guards, Director-General of the Territorial Force, War Office.
- Lieutenant-General William Pitcairn Campbell CB, General Officer Commanding-in-Chief, Southern Command.
- Major-General William Henry Birkbeck CB CMG, Director of Remounts, War Office.
- Major-General George Kenneth Scott-Moncrieff CB CIE, Director of Fortifications and Works, War Office.
- Major-General Edward Ritchie Coryton Graham CB, Colonel, The Cheshire Regiment.
- Major-General Thomas Lethbridge Napier Morland CB DSO
- Major-General Thomas D'Oyly Snow CB
- Major-General Francis John Davies CB
- Major-General Henry Hughes Wilson CB DSO
- Major-General Henry Fuller Maitland Wilson CB
- Lieutenant-General Henry Buckley Burton Watkis CB, Indian Army.

Civil Division

- George Stapylton Barnes CB, Second Secretary, The Board of Trade.
- Malcolm Graham Ramsay CB, Assistant Secretary, The Treasury.
- The Rt. Hon. Sir John Fletcher, Baron Moulton FRS

==== Companion of the Order of the Bath (CB) ====
Military Division
Royal Navy

- Vice-Admiral Edward George Shortland (retired).
- Engineer-Commander Harry Lashmore RN

Army

- Surgeon-General Thomas Martin Corker
- Major-General Charles Irwin Fry, Indian Army.
- Major-General Walter Charles Hunter-Blair.
- Colonel Coventry Williams.
- Colonel Edward Douglas Brown-Synge-Hutchinson VC
- Colonel William Robert Stewart, Assistant Director of Fortifications and Works, War Office.
- Colonel Reginald Salmond Curtis CMG DSO, Assistant Adjutant-General for Royal Engineers, War Office.
- Colonel William George Hamilton DSO
- Colonel Duncan Alwyn Macfarlane DSO
- Colonel Alfred Horsford Bingley CIE, Indian Army.
- Colonel Richard Henry Ewart CIE DSO ADC, Indian Army.
- Colonel William George Lawrence Beynon DSO, Indian Army.
- Colonel Edward Mabbott Woodward.
- Colonel Alexander Beamish Hamilton.
- Colonel Walter Coote Hedley, General Staff, War Office.
- Colonel the Hon. Alan Richard Montagu-Stuart-Wortley DSO, Director of Movements, War Office.
- Colonel Richard Wapshare, Indian Army.
- Colonel Frederick William George Wadeson, Indian Army.
- Colonel Claud William Jacob, Indian Army.
- Colonel Arthur Edward Aveling Holland MVO DSO
- Colonel Alfred Stokes DSO
- Colonel Ricardo Dartnell Petrie.
- Colonel Harry Neptune Sargent DSO
- Lieutenant-Colonel and Brevet Colonel Edmund Howard Gorges DSO, Commandant, West African Regiment.
- Colonel Owen Cadogan Wolley-Dod DSO
- Colonel Alexander Stanhope Cobbe VC DSO ADC, Indian Army.
- Colonel Frederic James Heyworth DSO
- Colonel Sherwood Dighton Browne.
- Colonel Arthur Lynden Lynden-Bell CMG
- Colonel Sinclair Westcott CMG, Army Medical Service.
- Colonel Robert St. Clair Lecky.
- Colonel Robert James Geddes DSO , Army Medical Service.
- Colonel Robert Wanless-O'Gowan.
- Colonel Sidney Henry Powell.
- Colonel Lochinvar Alexander Charles Gordon.
- Colonel Arlington Augustus Chichester DSO
- Colonel William Arthur Robinson.
- Colonel Henry Joseph Everett.
- Colonel Evan Eyare Carter CMG MVO
- Colonel Maurice Percy Cue Holt DSO
- Colonel James Meek, Army Medical Service.
- Colonel Thomas Heron, Army Ordnance Department.
- Colonel Samuel Henry Winter.
- Colonel William Travers Swan, Army Medical Service.
- Brevet Colonel George Richard Tyrell Rundle, Royal Artillery.
- Colonel Howard Carr, Army Medical Service.
- Colonel Edward Feetham.
- Colonel Samuel Guise-Moores, Army Medical Service.
- Lieutenant-Colonel Laurence George Frank Gordon DSO, Royal Artillery.
- Lieutenant-Colonel Vincent Alexander Ormsby, Indian Army.
- Lieutenant-Colonel James McCall Maxwell, Royal Artillery.
- Lieutenant-Colonel Richard Philipps Lee, Royal Engineers.
- Lieutenant-Colonel George de Symons Barrow, Indian Army.
- Lieutenant-Colonel John Henry Twiss, Royal Engineers.
- Lieutenant-Colonel Charles Stewart Prichard DSO, The Northamptonshire Regiment.
- Lieutenant-Colonel Harold Arthur Lewis Tagart DSO, 15th Hussars.
- Lieutenant-Colonel Robert William Hawthorn Ronaldson, The Highland Light Infantry.
- Lieutenant-Colonel Frederick Maurice Wilson, Army Service Corps.
- Lieutenant-Colonel George Templer Widdicombe, Indian Army.
- Lieutenant-Colonel Frederick Annesley Dudgeon, The Prince of Wales's Volunteers (South Lancashire Regiment).
- Lieutenant-Colonel Richard Fowler-Butler, The Royal Fusiliers (City of London Regiment).
- Lieutenant-Colonel Wilfred William Ogilvy Beveridge DSO , Royal Army Medical Corps.
- Lieutenant-Colonel William Price CMG, Director of Army Postal Services, Royal Engineers, Special Reserve.
- Lieutenant-Colonel Percy de Sausmarez Burney, Royal Artillery.
- Lieutenant-Colonel Henry Allan Roughton May, The London Regiment (Artists' Rifles) (Territorial Force).
- Lieutenant-Colonel Sir Wilmot Parker Herringham, Army Medical Service (Territorial Force).
- Temp. Colonel Sir Almroth Edward Wright FRCSI FRS, Army Medical Service.
- Temp. Colonel Frédéric François Burghard FRCS, Army Medical Service (Territorial Force).

Australian Forces

- Lieutenant-Colonel Neville Reginald Howse VC, Mediterranean Expeditionary Force (Staff).

Canadian Forces

- Colonel Arthur William Currie, 2nd Canadian Infantry Brigade.
- Colonel Malcolm Smith Mercer, 3rd Canadian Infantry Brigade.
- Colonel Richard Ernest William Turner VC DSO, 1st Canadian Infantry Brigade.
- Lieutenant-Colonel Henry Edward Burstall, Divisional Artillery, 1st Canadian Division.
- Lieutenant-Colonel Gilbert Lafayette Foster, Canadian Army Medical Corps.

New Zealand Forces

- Colonel Edward Walter Clervaux Chaytor, New Zealand Staff Corps, Mediterranean Expeditionary Force (Staff).

Civil Division

- Capt. William Reginald Hall RN
- Commander (Acting) John Alexander Duncan RN
- Eustace Henry Tennyson-d'Eyncourt, Director of Naval Construction, Admiralty.
- Colonel John Arthur Edelsten VD, late Secretary of the West Lancashire Territorial Force Association and formerly Commanding 1st Volunteer Battalion, The Prince of Wales's Volunteers (South Lancashire Regiment).
- Colonel Edward Hamilton Seymour, Deputy Director of Equipment and Ordnance Stores, War Office.
- Colonel the Hon. Francis Richard Bingham, Assistant Director of Artillery, War Office.
- Colonel Francis Torriano Fisher, Superintendent of the Royal Gunpowder and Small Arms Factories.
- Colonel Harold Stephen Langhorne, Army Ordnance Department.
- Edwin John Cheney, Chief Agricultural Adviser, The Board of Agriculture and Fisheries.
- Edward Charles Cunningham, Secretary, The Board of Customs and Excise.
- John Lamb, Assistant Under-Secretary, The Scottish Office.
- Ernest Moon KC, Counsel to the Rt. Hon. Speaker of the House of Commons
- Malcolm Cotter Caristou Setou, Judicial and Public Secretary, Correspondence Department, The India Office.
- Guy Stephenson, Assistant Director of Public Prosecutions.
- William Arthur Robinson, Assistant Secretary, The Office of Works.
- Charles Walker, Principal Clerk, The Admiralty.
- Herbert James Greedy MVO, Private Secretary to the Secretary of State for War.

=== The Most Exalted Order of the Star of India ===
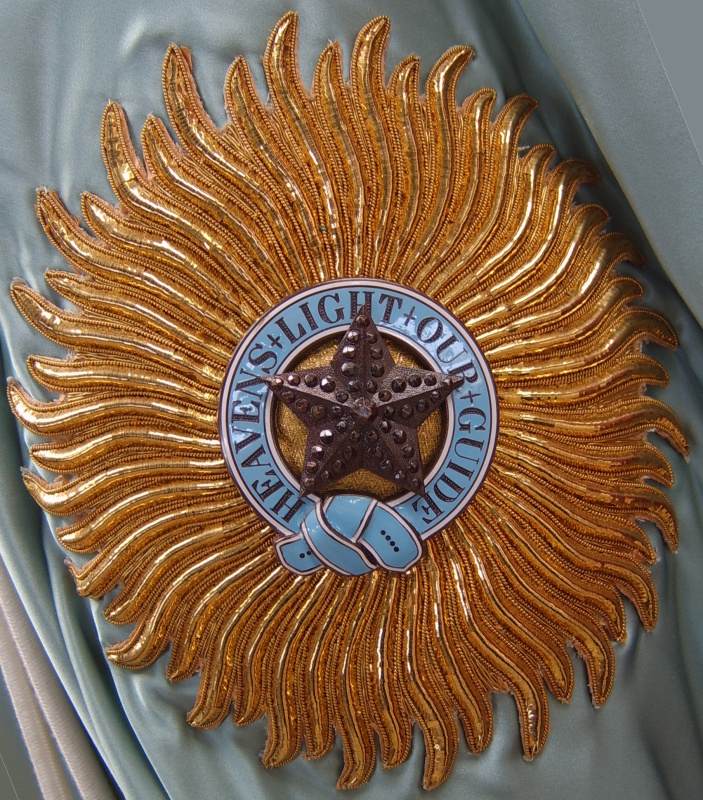
Star of a Knight Grand Commander of the Most Exalted Order of the Star of India.

==== Knight Commander (KCSI) ====
- Pazhamaneri Sundaram Sivaswami Iyer CSI CIE, an Ordinary Member of the Council of the Governor of Fort St. George, Madras.
- Sir Frederick William Duke KCIE CSI, Indian Civil Service (retired), a Member of the Council of India.
- Edward Albert Gait CSI CIE Indian Civil Service, an Ordinary Member of the Council of the Lieutenant-Governor of Bihar and Orissa.
- His Highness Nawab Ahmad Ali Khan Sherwani Bahadur, Chief of Maler Kotla, Punjab.
- His Highness Raja Amar Prakash Bahadur, Chief of Sirmur (Nahan), Punjab.
- Lieutenant-Colonel Alexander Fleetwood Pinhey CSI CIE, Indian Army, Indian Political Department, Resident, Hyderabad.
- William Henry Clark CSI CMG, an Ordinary Member of the Council of the Governor-General.
- Sir William Stevenson Meyer KCIE, Indian Civil Service, an Ordinary Member of the Council of the Governor-General.

==== Companion (CSI) ====
- Alan Butterworth, Indian Civil Service, Chief Secretary to the Government of Madras, and an Additional Member of the Council of the Governor for making Laws and Regulations.
- Stephen Meredyth Edwardes CVO, Indian Civil Service, Commissioner of Police, Bombay.
- Nicholas Dodd Beatson-Bell CIE Indian Civil Service, an Ordinary Member of the Council of the Governor of Bengal.
- Lieutenant-Colonel Francis Hardinge Eliott, Indian Army, Commissioner of the Irrawaddy Division, Burma.
- Major-General Robert Charles Ochiltree Stuart, Royal Artillery, Director-General of Ordnance in India.
- Herbert John Maynard, Indian Civil Service, Commissioner of the Lahore Division, Punjab, and an Additional Member of the Council of the Governor General for making Laws and Regulations.
- Reginald Pemberton Russell, Secretary to the Government of India in the Public Works Department, and an Additional Member of the Council of the Governor-General for making Laws and Regulations.
- James Bennett Brunyate CIE, Indian Civil Service, Secretary to the Government of India in the Finance Department, and an Additional Member of the Council of the Governor-General for making Laws and Regulations.
- Lieutenant-Colonel Armine Brereton Dew CIE Indian Army, Indian Political Department, Political Agent, Kalat, Baluchistan.
- William Malcolm Hailey CIE, Indian Civil Service, Chief Commissioner of Delhi.
- Hugh Trowbridge Keeling AMICE, Chief Engineer and Secretary to the Chief Commissioner, Delhi, and a Member of the Delhi Imperial Committee.
- Alfred Hamilton Grant CIE, Indian Civil Service, Secretary to the Government of India, Foreign and Political Department.

=== The Most Distinguished Order of Saint Michael and Saint George ===
Star of the Order of Saint Michael and Saint George

==== Knight Grand Cross of the Order of St Michael and St George (GCMG) ====
- His Excellency the Rt. Hon. Sir James Rennell Rodd GCVO KCMG CB, His Majesty's Ambassador Extraordinary and Plenipotentiary to His Majesty the King of Italy.
- General Sir Horace Lockwood Smith-Dorrien GCB DSO, Colonel, Nottinghamshire and Derbyshire Regiment
- Lieutenant-General Sir James Willcocks KCB KCSI KCMG DSO, Commanding Indian Army Corps, British Expeditionary Force

==== Knight Commander of the Order of St Michael and St George (KCMG) ====
- His Honour Lieutenant-Colonel John Strathearn Hendrie CVO, Lieutenant-Governor of the Province of Ontario.
- The Hon. Francis Henry Dillon Bell KC, Minister of Internal Affairs and of Immigration and Leader of the Legislative Council, Dominion of New Zealand.
- Colonel the Hon. Charles Preston Crewe CB, Member of the House of Assembly of the Union of South Africa.
- Henry Leclézio CMG, Elected Member of the Council of Government of the Colony of Mauritius.
- William Peterson CMG, Principal and Vice-Chancellor of McGill University, Montreal.
- Colonel George Leuchars CMG DSO, Member of the House of Assembly of the Union of South Africa. Minister of Commerce and industries, 1911-1912.
- Charles Louis des Graz, His Majesty's Envoy Extraordinary and Minister Plenipotentiary to His Majesty the King of Serbia.
- Francis William Stronge, His Majesty's Envoy Extraordinary and Minister Plenipotentiary to the Republic of Chile.
- Lieutenant-General Sir John Grenfell Maxwell KCB CVO CMG DSO, Colonel, the Black Watch (Royal Highlanders), General Officer Commanding The Force in Egypt
- Major-General Sir Cecil Frederick Nevil Macready KCB, Adjutant-General, British Expeditionary Force
- Major-General William Riddell Birdwood KCSI CIE DSO, Indian Army, Mediterranean Expeditionary Force

==== Companion of the Order of St Michael and St George (CMG) ====
- Edward Gream Antrobus, Chief Accountant and Chief Clerk, Office of the Crown Agents for the Colonies.
- Arthur William Garrard Bagshawe, Director of the Tropical Diseases Bureau.
- Frederick Bowes, Principal Collector of Customs of the Island of Ceylon.
- Frederick George Augustus Butler, of the Colonial Office.
- Hector Livingstone Duff, Chief Secretary, Nyasaland Protectorate.
- Dr. Daniel Miner Gordon , Principal and Vice-Chancellor of Queen's University, Kingston, Ontario.
- Reginald Charles Hare, late Secretary, Office of the Agent-General for Western Australia.
- William George Maxwell, British Adviser to the Kedah Government.
- Brigadier-General Dudley Howard Ridout, Royal Engineers, in recognition of services during the recent disturbances at Singapore.
- Commander Richard Markham Tyringham Stephens RN, Chief of Staff, Department of the Naval Service, Dominion of Canada.
- James Leslie Williams, Under Secretary, Department of the Attorney-General and of Justice, State of New South Wales.
- Major Frederick Carkeet Bryant RA, for services in connection with military operations in Togoland.
- Malcolm Arnold Robertson, His Majesty's Chargé d'Affaires at Rio de Janeiro.
- Martyn Cecil Gurney MVO, His Majesty's Consul-General at Marseilles.
- Harry Lionel Churchill, His Majesty's Consul-General at Havre.
- Lieutenant-Colonel Oswald Arthur Gerald FitzGerald, Personal Military Secretary to the Secretary of State for War.
- William Meyrick Hewlett, Acting British Consul at Shanghai.
- Photius Philip Constantine Zaphiro, British Vice-Consul at Addis Ababa.
- The Reverend John Morrow Simms KHC Principal Chaplain to the Forces. Army Chaplains' Department
- Colonel Wellesley Lynedoch Henry Paget,CB MVO
- Colonel Francis John De Gex CB
- Colonel Charles Massy Mathew CB DSO
- The Reverend Jacob Blackbourne, Chaplain to the Forces, 1st Class, Army Chaplains' Department
- The Reverend William Stevenson Jaffray, Chaplain to the Forces, 1st Class, Army Chaplains' Department
- The Reverend Ewen George Fitzroy Macpherson, Chaplain to the Forces, 1st Class, Army Chaplains' Department
- Colonel Ernest Reuben Charles Butler FRCVS, Army Veterinary Service
- Colonel Colquhoun Grant Morrison
- Colonel Henry Brooke Hagstromer Wright, Chief Engineer, Egypt
- Colonel John Anderson Dealy
- Colonel Herbert de Touffreville Phillips, Royal Artillery
- Colonel Lancelot Graham, Royal Artillery
- Honorary Colonel Henry Adeane Erskine CB, Northumberland Divisional Train
- Colonel Francis Sudlow Garratt CB DSO, Retired Pay
- Brevet Colonel Courtenay Bourchier Vyvyan CB, Retired Pay, East Kent Regiment
- Lieutenant-Colonel and Brevet Colonel Henry Joseph Walker Jerome CB, Retired Pay, Royal Engineers
- Lieutenant-Colonel George Sidney Sheppard, Indian Army
- Lieutenant-Colonel Algernon Edward Luke Wear, Royal Army Medical Corps
- Lieutenant-Colonel Arthur William Bentley Buckle, Army Pay Department
- Lieutenant-Colonel The Right Honourable Lord Richard Frederick Cavendish, 5th Battalion, Royal Lancaster Regiment
- Lieutenant-Colonel Algernon Hamilton Stannus Goff, Royal Artillery
- Lieutenant-Colonel Henry Wickham, Northamptonshire Yeomanry
- Lieutenant-Colonel Frederic Gustav Lewis, 13th Princess Louise's Kensington Battalion, London Regiment
- Lieutenant-Colonel Arthur Anthony Howell, 3rd Battalion, London Regiment, Royal Fusiliers
- Lieutenant-Colonel Harry Walker, 4th City of Dundee Battalion, Royal Highlanders
- Lieutenant-Colonel Colquhoun Scott Dodgson, Army Service Corps
- Lieutenant-Colonel Herbert Graham Stainforth, Indian Army
- Lieutenant-Colonel Rupert Shoolbred, 16th Battalion, London Regiment, Queen's Westminster Rifles
- Lieutenant-Colonel Robert Sydney Hamilton, Army Ordnance Department
- Lieutenant-Colonel Philip Geoffrey Twining MVO, Royal Engineers
- Lieutenant-Colonel Frederick George Langham, 5th Battalion, Royal Sussex Regiment
- Lieutenant-Colonel Arthur Slade Baker, Army Ordnance Department
- Lieutenant-Colonel Valentine Murray, Royal Engineers
- Lieutenant-Colonel David Aubrey Callender, Royal Scots (Lothian Regiment)
- Lieutenant-Colonel William Tankerville Monypenny Reeve, Leinster Regiment
- Lieutenant-Colonel Tom Harry Finch Pearse, Cheshire Regiment
- Lieutenant-Colonel Robert Hall Hayes, Middlesex Regiment
- Lieutenant-Colonel Campbell Coffin, Royal Engineers
- Lieutenant-Colonel Frederick Potts, Royal Artillery
- Lieutenant-Colonel David Henry Drake-Brockman, Indian Army
- Lieutenant-Colonel Joseph Oates Travers DSO, Devonshire Regiment
- Lieutenant-Colonel Reginald Burge Shipley, 9th Battalion, London Regiment, Queen Victoria's Rifles
- Lieutenant-Colonel Thomas Owen Marden, Welsh Regiment
- Lieutenant-Colonel Frederick Thornhill Ravenhill, Royal Artillery
- Lieutenant-Colonel John Patrick Cumberlege Hennessy, Indian Army
- Lieutenant-Colonel Henry Arthur Peyton Lindsay, Indian Army
- Lieutenant-Colonel Thomas Walter Viscount Hampden, Hertfordshire Regiment
- Lieutenant-Colonel David James Mason MacFarlane, 4th Ross Highland Battalion, Seaforth Highlanders
- Lieutenant-Colonel Philip Richard Wood, Royal Irish Fusiliers
- Lieutenant-Colonel Ralph Glyn Ouseley DSO, Royal Artillery
- Lieutenant-Colonel Alban Randell Crofton Atkins, Army Service Corps
- Lieutenant-Colonel Charles Harford Bowie-Evans, Indian Medical Service
- Lieutenant-Colonel Charles Crawford Murray, 9th Glasgow Highland Battalion, Highland Light Infantry
- Lieutenant-Colonel Robert James Bridgford DSO, Shropshire Light Infantry
- Lieutenant-Colonel Charles Hesketh Grant Moore DSO, Indian Army
- Lieutenant-Colonel Nathaniel Melhuish Comins Stevens, Indian Army
- Major and Brevet Lieutenant-Colonel John Campbell DSO, Cameron Highlanders
- Lieutenant-Colonel Hamilton Lyster Reed VC Royal Artillery
- Lieutenant-Colonel Arthur Dugdale, Oxfordshire Hussars Yeomanry
- Lieutenant-Colonel Frank Wall, Indian Medical Service
- Lieutenant-Colonel Gilbert Stewart Crawford, Royal Army Medical Corps
- Lieutenant-Colonel Orlando George Gunning, Indian Army
- Lieutenant-Colonel Walter Edmund Kerrich, Retired Pay, Royal Artillery (Indian Ordnance Department)
- Lieutenant-Colonel Edward Treffry, Honourable Artillery Company
- Lieutenant-Colonel Alfred Danvers Bayliffe, 12th Battalion, London Regiment, Rangers
- Lieutenant-Colonel William Quintyne Winwood DSO, 5th Dragoon Guards
- Lieutenant-Colonel George Tom Molesworth Bridges DSO, 4th Hussars
- Lieutenant-Colonel Henry Worsley Worsley-Gough, 3rd Battalion, Monmouthshire Regiment
- Lieutenant-Colonel Charles Edward Stewart, Royal Highlanders
- Lieutenant-Colonel Wilfred Spedding Swabey, Army Service Corps
- Lieutenant-Colonel Beresford Cecil Molyneux Carter, Liverpool Regiment
- Lieutenant-Colonel Ernest Wright Alexander VC, Royal Artillery
- Lieutenant-Colonel George Ross Marryat Church, Royal Artillery
- Lieutenant-Colonel William Basil Emery, Royal Artillery
- Lieutenant-Colonel Godfrey Bingham Hinton, Royal Artillery
- Lieutenant-Colonel Henry Edward Theodore Kelly, Royal Artillery
- Lieutenant-Colonel Graham Henry Whalley Nicholson, Royal Artillery
- Temp. Lieutenant-Colonel (Rear-Admiral, retired) Gerald Charles Adolphe Marescaux, Deputy Assistant Quartermaster-General (Base)
- Lieutenant-Colonel Charles William Compton, Somerset Light Infantry
- Lieutenant-Colonel Thomas Ogilvie, 4th Battalion, Gordon Highlanders
- Lieutenant-Colonel Jonathan Roberts Davidson, 10th Scottish Battalion, Liverpool Regiment
- Lieutenant-Colonel Stuart Rodger Kirby, 6th Dragoon Guards
- Lieutenant-Colonel David Ramsay Sladen DSO, King's Own Scottish Borderers
- Lieutenant-Colonel Percy Alexander Turner, West Riding Regiment
- Lieutenant-Colonel Alister Fraser Gordon DSO, Gordon Highlanders
- Lieutenant-Colonel James Attenborough, 2nd Battalion, London Regiment, Royal Fusiliers
- Lieutenant-Colonel Hugh Stanley Thurston, Royal Army Medical Corps
- Lieutenant-Colonel Bernard Charles Green, 14th Battalion, London Regiment, London Scottish
- Lieutenant-Colonel Stevenson Lyle Cummins, Royal Army Medical Corps
- Lieutenant-Colonel Percy Evans, Royal Army Medical Corps
- Lieutenant-Colonel Harold Ben Fawcus, Royal Army Medical Corps
- Lieutenant-Colonel Thomas Herbert John Chapman Goodwin DSO, Royal Army Medical Corps
- Lieutenant-Colonel John Charles Baron Statham, Royal Army Medical Corps
- Lieutenant-Colonel Arthur Lisle Ambrose-Webb, Royal Army Medical Corps
- Lieutenant-Colonel William Percival Monkhouse MVO, Royal Artillery
- Major Reginald Salter Weston, Manchester Regiment
- Major Percy Umfreville, Royal West Kent Regiment
- Major James Hawkins-Whitshed Pollard, Royal Scots Fusiliers
- Major Henry Ernest Walshe, South Staffordshire Regiment
- Major Henry Thomas Caiitan, Duke of Cornwall's Light Infantry
- Major Frederick Welsley Hunt, Army Veterinary Corps
- Major Cranley Charlton Onslow, Bedfordshire Regiment
- Major Hugh Norman Ramsay Cowie DSO, Dorsetshire Regiment
- Major Julian Mayne Young, Army Service Corps
- Major Evan Gibb DSO, Army Service Corps
- Major James Fitzgerald Martin, Royal Army Medical Corps
- Major John Bartholomew Wroughton, Royal Sussex Regiment
- Major Sir Edward Scott Worthington MVO, Royal Army Medical Corps
- Major Henry Edward ap Rhys Pryce, Indian Army
- Major Louis James Lipsett, Royal Irish Regiment (attached Canadian Forces
- Major Henry Page Croft, Hertfordshire Regiment
- Major George Alfred FitzGerald DSO, Royal Artillery
- Major Hew Francis Blair-Imrie, 5th Angus and Dundee Battalion, Royal Highlanders
- Major Reginald Francis Arthur Hobbs DSO, Royal Engineers
- Major Cecil Howie Saunders, Army Ordnance Department
- Major Erroll Mervyn de Smidt, Army Ordnance Department
- Major Charles Glencairn Hill DSO, Royal Berkshire Regiment
- Major Lloyd Newton Jones-Bateman, Norfolk Regiment
- Temp. Lieutenant-Colonel Gilbert Falkingham Clayton, Royal Artillery
- Lieutenant-Colonel Robert Gilmour Edwards Leckie, 16th Canadian Battalion
- Lieutenant-Colonel Frederick Samuel Lampson Ford, Canadian Army Medical Corps

Honorary Companion

- Lieutenant-Colonel Jean-Eugène-Pierre Maroix of the French Army, for services in connection with military operations in Togoland.

=== The Most Eminent Order of the Indian Empire ===
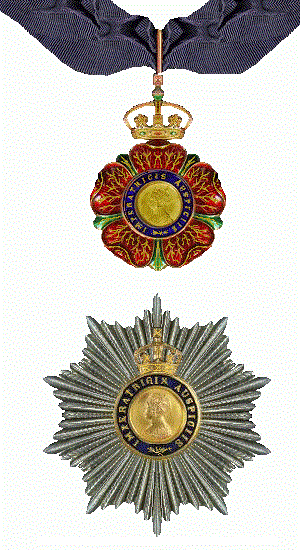
Riband, badge and star of the Knight Grand Commander of the Order of the Indian Empire

==== Knight Grand Commander (GCIE) ====
- Sir Charles Stuart Bayley KCSI ISO, Indian Civil Service, Lieutenant-Governor of Bihar and Orissa.
- Maharaja Sir Rameshwar Singh Bahadur KCIE of Darbhanga, an Ordinary Member of the Council of the Lieutenant-Governor of Bihar and Orissa.

==== Knight Commander (KCIE) ====
- Prabhashankar Pattani (Prabhashankar Dalpatram Pattani) CIE, Temp. Member of the Council of the Governor of Bombay.
- Maharaja Manindra Chandra Nandy of Kasimbazar, Zemindar, Murshidabad, Bengal, an Additional Member of the Council of the Governor-General for making Laws and Regulations.
- Lieutenant-Colonel John Ramsay CSI CIE, Indian Political Department, Agent to the Governor-General and Chief Commissioner in Baluchistan.
- William Maxwell CIE MVO, Indian Civil Service, Director-General of Posts and Telegraphs, and an Additional Member of the Council of the Governor-General for making Laws and Regulations.
- Faridoonji Jamshedji CSI CIE, Assistant Minister, Political Department, to the Government of His Highness the Nizam of Hyderabad.
- Mokshagundam Visvesvaraya CIE, Dewan of Mysore.
- His Highness Maharaja Bir Singh Deo Bahadur, Chief of Samthar, Bundelkhand, Central India.
- John Stuart Donald CSI CIE, Indian Political Department, Resident in Waziristan, North-West Frontier Province.
- Lieutenant-Colonel Percy Molesworth Sykes CMG CIE, Indian Political Department, Consul-General, Kashgar.

==== Companion (CIE) ====
- Cecil Bernard Cotterell, Indian Civil Service, Private Secretary to His Excellency the Governor of Madras.
- Alfred Wyndham Lushington, Imperial Forest Service, Conservator of Forests, Northern Circle, Madras.
- Sardar Sahib Suleman Haji Kassim Mitha, Justice of the Peace, Bombay.
- George Prideaux Millet, Indian Forest Service, Senior Conservator of Forests, Bombay Presidency.
- Babu Ram Charan Mitra, Vakil of the High Court of Judicature at Fort William, Bengal, and Law Officer of Government.
- Lieutenant-Colonel Walter Thomas Grice VD, Commandant, 1st Battalion, Calcutta Volunteer Rifles, and an Additional Member of the Council of the Governor of Bengal for making Laws and Regulations.
- Lieutenant-Colonel Travers Dennys, Indian Army, Inspector-General of Police, Punjab.
- Selwyn Howe Fremantle, Indian Civil Service, Collector and Magistrate of Allahabad, United Provinces.
- Ziauddin Ahmad , Professor in the Mohammedan Anglo-Oriental College, Aligarh, United Provinces.
- Abdul Karim Abdul Shakur Jamal, Rangoon, Burma.
- Lieutenant-Colonel Cecil Charles Stewart Barry, Indian Medical Service, Medical Superintendent, General Hospital, Rangoon, Burma.
- John Frederick Grunnig, Indian Civil Service, Magistrate and Collector, Shahabad, Bihar and Orissa.
- Brigadier-General Benjamin Holloway, Indian Army, Secretary to the Government of India in the Army Department, and an Additional Member of the Council of the Governor-General for making Laws and Regulations.
- Capt. Cyril Mosley Wagstaff, Royal Engineers, General Staff Officer, 2nd Grade, Army Headquarters.
- Arthur Robert Anderson, Member, Railway Board.
- Colonel Charles Henry Cowie, Royal Engineers, Agent, North-Western State Railway.
- Kunwar Maharaj Singh Barrister-at-Law, Provincial Service, Senior Assistant Secretary to the Government of India, Education Department.
- David Petrie, Indian Police, Superintendent of Police, Punjab.
- Godfrey Charles Denham, Indian Police, Superintendent of Police, Bengal.
- Lieutenant-Colonel Joseph Windham, Indian Army, Indian Political Department, Resident, Western Rajputana States.
- Herbert George Clark, Commercial Adviser to the Resident in the Persian Gulf.
- Lieutenant-Colonel Charles Henry Dudley Ryder DSO, Royal Engineers, Deputy Superintendent of Survey of India, and lately in charge Turco-Persian Frontier Commission, Survey Detachment.
- Geoffrey Fitzhervey de Montmorency, Indian Civil Service, Personal Assistant to the Chief Commissioner, Delhi.
- Raja Partab Singh, Chief of Ali Rajpur, Bhopawar, Central India.

=== Imperial Service Order (ISO) ===
Home Civil Service

- George Henry Ashdown, Assistant Director of Stores, Admiralty.
- Alexander Barnes, Accountant-General, Board of Trade.
- Edgar Brine, Comptroller of Accounts and Stores, Prison Commission.
- John Mitchell Brown, Clerk in Charge of Accounts, Civil Service Commission.
- John William Colton, Clerk in Charge of Accounts, Local Government Board.
- Charles Herman de Lemos, H.M. Consul at Ciudad Bolivar.
- Daniel Forbes, Chief Clerk, General Board of Control for Scotland.
- Frederick Hellard, Joint Secretary, Office of Woods, Forests and Land Revenues.
- Joseph Hunt, Principal Clerk, Ordnance Factories.
- Anthony Ormsby, Principal Clerk, Treasury Remembrancer's Office, Dublin Castle.
- John Erwin Piper, Assistant Solicitor, Inland Revenue.
- David Mitchell Stewart, Superintending Engineer, General Post Office.

Colonial Civil Service

- Frederic Charles Bigger, Receiver of Revenue, Johannesburg.
- Louis Albert Célestin, Superintendent of Inland Revenue and Distilleries, Colony of Mauritius.
- Capt. Richard Burton Deane, lately Superintendent, Royal North-West Mounted Police Force, Dominion of Canada.
- James Edward Aquart Ferguson, Government Medical Center, Colony of British Guiana.
- Francis Hernaman Gisborne KC, Parliamentary Counsel, Law Branch, House of Commons of Canada.
- James Mackenzie, Under Secretary for Crown Lands, Dominion of New Zealand.
- Lionel William Stanton, Secretary to the Minister of Education and Secretary to the Education Department, State of South Australia.
- James Wilkinson Whyte, Recorder of Titles, Land Titles Office, State of Tasmania.

Indian Civil Service

- Charles Edward James Twisaday, Office of the Secretary of State for India.
- Ernest Charles Winchester, Office of the Secretary of State for India.
- Sir George Edward Knox Kt, Indian Civil Service, a Puisne Judge of the High Court of Judicature, North-Western Provinces.
- Raj Chuni Lal Basu Bahadur FCS, 1st Assistant Chemical Examiner of Government, Teacher of Physics and Chemistry, Campbell Medical School, and Fellow of the Calcutta University.
- Harrington George Bulkley, Assistant Collector of Salt Revenue, Thana, Bombay Presidency.
- Raj Bahadur Lala Gauri Shankar, Provincial Service, Extra Assistant Commissioner in the Punjab.
- Frank Dacombe Bird VD, Chief Presidency Magistrate, Madras.
- Maung Paw Tun, Provincial Civil Service, Judge, Sub-Divisional Courts of Insein and Taikgyi, Burma.
- Richard Joshua Keys, Indian Telegraph Department, Deputy Superintendent, Traffic, Shimla.
- Bomanji Nowroji Khambatta, Head Clerk, Office of Assistant Director of Supplies and Transports, 6th (Poona) Division.
- James Henry Taylor, Provincial Civil Service, Deputy Commissioner of Augul, Bihar and Orissa.
- Khan Bahadur Muhammad Abdul Kurnn Khan, Provincial Service, Extra Assistant Commissioner, District Judge, Hazara, North-West Frontier Province.
- Rafi Sahib Lala Bhag Mai, Personal Indian Assistant to the Agent to the Governor-General and Chief Commissioner in Baluchistan.

=== Victoria Cross (VC) ===
Victoria Cross Medal

- † Lieutenant-Colonel Charles Hotham Montagu Doughty-Wylie, CB CMG Headquarters Staff, Mediterranean Expeditionary Force; and
- † Captain Garth Neville Walford, Brigade Major, Royal Artillery, Mediterranean Expeditionary Force. Citation —

'"On 26th April, 1915, subsequent to a landing having been effected on the beach at a point on the Gallipoli Peninsula, during which both Brigadier-General and Brigade Major had been killed, Lieutenant-Colonel Doughty-Wylie and Captain Walford organized and led an, attack through and on both sides of the village of Sedd-el-Bahr on the Old Castle at the top of the hill inland. The enemy's position was very strongly held and entrenched, and defended with concealed machine-guns and pom-poms. It was mainly due to the initiative, skill and great gallantry of these two Officers that the attack was a complete success. Both were killed in the moment of victory."

- Captain Francis Alexander Caron Scrimger, Canadian Army Medical Service, Medical Officer, 14th Battalion, Royal Montreal Regiment. Citation —

"On the afternoon of 25th April, 1915, in the neighbourhood of Ypres, when in charge of an advanced dressing station in some farm buildings, which were being heavily shelled by the enemy, he directed under heavy fire the removal of the wounded, and he himself carried a severely wounded Officer out of a stable in search of a place of greater safety. When he was unable alone to carry this Officer further, he remained with him under fire till help could be obtained During the very heavy fighting between 52nd and 25th April, Captain Scrimger displayed continuously day and night the greatest devotion to his duty among the wounded at the front."

- Lieutenant George Rowland Patrick Roupell, 1st Battalion, East Surrey Regiment. Citation —

"For most conspicuous gallantry and devotion to duty on April 20th, 1915, when he was commanding a company of his battalion in a front trench on "Hill 60," which was subjected to' a most severe bombardment throughout the day. Though wounded in several places, he remained at his post and led his company in repelling a strong German assault. During a lull in the bombardment he had his wounds hurriedly dressed, and then insisted in returning to his trench, which was again being subjected to severe bombardment. Towards evening, his company being dangerously weakened, he went back to his battalion headquarters, represented the situation to his Commanding Officer, and brought up reinforcements, passing backwards and forwards over ground swept by heavy fire. With these reinforcements he held his position throughout the night, and until his battalion was relieved next morning. This young Officer was one of the few survivors of his company, and showed a magnificent example of courage, devotion and tenacity, which undoubtedly inspired his men to hold out till the end."

- † Colour-Sergeant Frederick William Hall, 8th Canadian Battalion. Citation —

"On 24th April, 1915, in the neighbourhood of Ypres, when a wounded man who was lying some 15 yards from the trench called for help, Company Sergeant-Major Hall endeavoured to reach him in the face of a very heavy enfilade fire which was being poured in by the enemy. The first attempt-failed, and a Non-commissioned Officer and private soldier who were attempting to give assistance were both wounded. Company Sergeant-Major Hall then made a second most gallant attempt, and was in the act of lifting up the wounded man to bring him in when he fell mortally wounded in the head."

- Lance-Sergeant Douglas Walter Belcher, 1/5th (City of London) Battalion, London Regiment (London Rifle Brigade). Citation —

"On the early morning of 13th May, 1915, when in charge of a portion of an advanced breastwork south of the Wieltje-St. Julien Road during a very fierce and continuous bombardment by the enemy, which frequently blew in the breastwork, Lance-Sergeant Belcher with a mere handful of men elected to remain and endeavour to hold his position after the troops near him had been withdrawn. By his skill and great gallantry he maintained his position during the day, opening rapid fire on the enemy, who were only 150 to 200 yards distant, whenever he saw them collecting for an attack. There is little doubt that the bold front shown by Lance-Sergeant Belcher prevented the enemy breaking through on the Wieltje Road, and averted an attack on the flank of one of our Divisions."

- † Lance-Corporal Frederick Fisher, 13th Canadian Battalion. Citation —

"On 23rd April, 1915, in the neighbourhood of St. Julien, he went forward with the machine gun, of which he was in charge, under heavy fire, and most gallantly assisted in covering the retreat of a battery, losing four men of his gun team. Later, after obtaining four more men, he went forward again to the firing line and was himself killed while bringing his machine gun into action under very heavy fire, in order to cover the advance of supports."

- Private William Mariner, 2nd Battalion, King's Royal Rifle Corps. Citation —

"During a violent thunderstorm on the night of 22nd May, 1915, he left his trench near Cambrin, and crept out through the German wire entanglements till he reached the emplacement of a German machine gun which had been damaging our parapets and hindering our working parties. After climbing on the top of the German parapet he threw a bomb in under the roof of the gun emplacement and heard some groaning and the enemy running away. After about a quarter of an hour he heard some of them coming back again, and climbed up on the other side of the emplacement and threw another bomb among them left-handed. He then lay still while the Germans opened a heavy fire on the wire entanglement behind him, and it was only after about an hour that he was able to crawl back to his own trench. Before starting out he had requested a serjeant to open fire on the enemy's trenches as soon as he had thrown his bombs. Rifleman Mariner was out alone for one and a half hours carrying out this gallant work."

=== Distinguished Service Order (DSO) ===
Citation — The King has been graciously pleased to give orders for the following appointments to the Distinguished Service Order in respect of the undermentioned Officers, in recognition of their services with the Mediterranean Expeditionary Force:

- Commander Victor Lindsay Arbuthnot Campbell RN, Commanding Drake Battalion, Royal Naval Division.
- Lieutenant-Commander Bernard Cecil Freyberg, Royal Naval Volunteer Reserve, Hood Battalion, Royal Naval Division.

Citation — The King has been graciously pleased to approve of the following rewards for gallantry and devotion to duty in connection with the operations at the Dardanelles (Mediterranean Expeditionary Force):

- Lieutenant-Colonel W. R. McNicoll, 6th Australian Infantry Battalion (Victoria).
- Lieutenant-Colonel C. B. B. White, Royal Australian Garrison Artillery, Staff.
- Major Arthur Thackeray Beckwith, 2nd Battalion, The Hampshire Regiment.
- Major Charles Henry Brand, Brigade Major, 3rd Infantry Brigade (Australian Forces).
- Major James Samuel Denton, 11th Australian Infantry Battalion (West Australia).
- Major Herbert Ernest Hart, Wellington Battalion, 17th (Ruahine) Regiment, New Zealand Forces.
- Major James Heane, 4th Australian Infantry Battalion (New South Wales).
- Major William Owen Mansbridge, 16th Australian Infantry Battalion (South Australia, Western Australia).
- Major Eugene Joseph O'Neill FRCS New Zealand Medical Corps.
- Major Robert Rankine, 14th Australian Infantry Battalion (Victoria).
- Major Fred Waite, New Zealand Engineers Territorial Force.
- Capt. Edward William Atkinson, 1st Battalion, The Royal Inniskilling Fusiliers.
- Capt. Arthur Graham Butler, Australian Army Medical Corps (attached 9th Australian Infantry Battalion) (Queensland).
- Capt. Arthur Cunliffe Bernard Critchley-Salmonson, The Royal Munster Fusiliers (Attached New Zealand Forces).
- Capt. Guy Westland Geddes, 1st Battalion, The Royal Munster Fusiliers.
- Capt. Richard Haworth, 1st Battalion, The Lancashire Fusiliers.
- Capt. Cecil Ridings, 1st Battalion, The Royal Inniskilling Fusiliers.
- Lieutenant Henry Desmond O'Hara, 1st Battalion, The Royal Dublin Fusiliers.

Additional Companions of the Distinguished Service Order

- Major George Henry Addison, Royal Engineers
- Major Henry Lethbridge Alexander, Dorsetshire Regiment
- Major John Maurice Arthur, Territorial Force, 1st Lowland Field Company
- Major Charles Ernest Atchison, King's Shropshire Light Infantry
- Major Patterson Barton, Royal Regiment of Artillery
- Major Arthur Sydney Bates, London Regiment, 5th City of London Battalion (London Rifle Brigade)
- Captain John Douglas Mortimer Beckett, Hampshire Regiment
- Major Alfred Bryan Bethell, Royal Regiment of Artillery
- Major Paget Kemmis Betty, Royal Engineers
- Major Humphrey Francis William Bircham, King's Royal Rifle Corps
- Hon. Major Walter William Blades, Army Ordnance Department
- Major William Alan Blake, Wiltshire Regiment
- Major Lyster Fettiplace Blandy, Royal Engineers
- Major Guy Hamilton Boileau, Royal Engineers
- Major Oswald Cuthbert Borrett, King's Own (Royal Lancaster Regiment)
- Major Hugh Edward Richard Boxer, Lincolnshire Regiment
- Major John Eric Spencer Brind, Royal Artillery
- Major Christopher Robert Ingham Brooke, King's Own Yorkshire Light Infantry
- Brevet Major H. R. M. Brooke-Popham, Royal Flying Corps, Oxfordshire and Buckinghamshire Light Infantry
- Major Alan Brough, Royal Engineers
- Captain Cuthbert Garrard Browne, Royal Army Medical Corps
- Captain Archibald Gordon Bruce, Royal Scots Fusiliers
- Major Colin Napier Buchanan-Dunlop, Royal Regiment of Artillery
- Major George Moultrie Bullen-Smith, Prince of Wales's Leinster Regiment (Royal Canadians)
- Captain Herbert Cecil Buller, Rifle Brigade (Prince Consort's Own) (attached Princess Patricia's Canadian Light Infantry)
- Captain Hubert Francis Burke, Royal Regiment of Artillery
- Captain Henry Pelham Burn, Gordon Highlanders
- Major Henry Mortimer Caddell, Army Service Corps
- Major Charles Archibald Calvert, Surrey Yeomanry (Queen Mary's Regiment)
- Captain Claude Henry Campbell, Manchester Regiment (attached London Regiment)
- Captain Herbert St Maur Carter Royal Army Medical Corps
- Captain Thomas Walter Colby Carthew, Royal Flying Corps, Bedfordshire Regiment
- Major James Graham Chaplin, Cameronians (Scottish Rifles)
- Major John Charteris, Royal Engineers
- Major Hubert Clementi Smith, Royal Engineers
- Lieutenant-Colonel William Fletcher Clemson, York and Lancaster Regiment
- Major George Sidney Clive, Grenadier Guards
- Major Arthur Stedman Cotton, Royal Regiment of Artillery
- Major Reginald Vionnee Cowey, Royal Army Medical Corps
- Captain Edgar William Cox, Royal Engineers
- Captain Thomas Joseph Crean VC, Royal Army Medical Corps
- Captain Cleland Bulstrode Cumberlege, Bedfordshire Regiment
- Major Dighton Hay Abercromby Dick, Royal Scots Fusiliers
- Captain John Greer Dill, Leinster Regiment
- Captain Henry Mountiford Dillon, Oxfordshire and Buckinghamshire Light Infantry
- Captain Raymond Vernon Doherty-Holwell, Royal Engineers
- Captain Winston Joseph Dugan, Worcestershire Regiment
- Major Robert Gilmour Earle, Royal Engineers
- Major Arthur Ellershaw, Royal Regiment of Artillery
- Captain Nigel Harry Skinner Fargus, Royal Scots (Lothian Regiment)
- Captain Edmund Bromfield Ferrers, Cameronians (Scottish Rifles)
- Major Thomas Evelyn Fielding, Royal Army Medical Corps
- Regimental Sergeant-Major W. Finney, Manchester Regiment
- Major Alan Francis Fletcher, 17th Lancers
- Major Henry Francis Fraser, 21st Lancers
- Captain Robert Gale, Royal Army Medical Corps
- Major Philip Woolcott Game, Royal Artillery
- Captain Henry George Gandy, Royal Engineers
- Major William Gemmill, Royal Scots (Lothian Regiment)
- Major George Francis Bennett Goldney, Royal Engineers
- Captain Lewis Gordon, Gordon Highlanders
- Major Philip Gould, Royal Irish Fusiliers (Princess Victoria's)
- Captain Edward Byng George Gregge-Hopwood, Coldstream Guards
- Major David Maitland Griffith, Royal Engineers
- Captain Ralph Gore Devereux Groves-Raines, Buffs (East Kent Regiment)
- Captain Robert Hadden Haining, Royal Artillery
- Major Gilbert Claud Hamilton, Grenadier Guards
- Major John Harington, Rifle Brigade (Prince Consort's Own)
- Captain Arthur Ellis Fowke Harris, Princess Charlotte of Wales's (Royal Berkshire Regiment)
- Major Robert Leycester Haymes, Royal Regiment of Artillery
- Major Ross John Finnis Hayter, Cheshire Regiment (Attached 1st Canadian Division)
- Major Austin Hubert Wightwick Haywood, Royal Regiment of Artillery
- Captain Hugh Roger Headlam, York and Lancaster Regiment
- Major Richard George Hely-Hutchinson, Royal Fusiliers (City of London Regiment)
- Captain Reginald John Thornton Hildyard, Royal West Kent Regiment
- Staff Major Hugh Hill MVO, Royal Welsh Fusiliers
- Captain Harry Sidney Hodgkin, 4th Royal Irish Dragoon Guards (attached Cheshire Regiment)
- Captain Lancelot Holland, Seaforth Highlanders
- Major John William Hope, Royal Regiment of Artillery
- Captain Richard Granville Hylton Howard-Vyse, Royal Horse Guards
- Major Herbert Gwynne Howell, Royal Regiment of Artillery
- Major Robert Hutchison, 4th Dragoon Guards
- Major Lionel Dalton Inglefield, Army Service Corps
- Major William Edmund Ironside, Royal Artillery
- Major Francis Stephen Irvine, Royal Army Medical
- Captain Aylmer Vivian Jarrett, York and Lancaster Regiment
- Corps Major Raymond Henry Johnson, Royal Artillery
- Captain Lumley Owen Williams Jones, Essex Regiment
- Captain Algernon Roderick Kino, East Yorkshire Regiment
- Major Gerald Richard Vivian Kinsman, Royal Regiment of Artillery
- Captain Michael Laurence Lakin, 11th Prince Albert's Own Hussars
- Major Francis Fane Lambarde, Reserve of Officers
- Captain Bertram Henry Leatham, Alexandra Princess of Wales's Own (Yorkshire Regiment)
- Major Eric Henry Goodwin Leggett, Royal Regiment of Artillery
- Captain Clive Gerard Liddell, Leicestershire Regiment
- Major Robert Clarence Wellesley Lukin, Indian Army
- Major Reginald Kirkpatrick Lynch-Staunton, Royal Artillery
- Captain Percy Arnold Lloyd-Jones Royal Army Medical Corps
- Major Hugh James Alexander MacKey MVO Royal Regiment of Artillery
- Major Charles Forbes Shaw MacLaverty, Royal Regiment of Artillery
- Major Harry Maclear, East Lancashire Regiment
- Major Charles William Macleod, Army Service Corps
- Captain Ernest Llewellyn Makin, Wiltshire Regiment (Duke of Edinburgh's)
- Captain Conwyn Mansel-Jones VC, Reserve of Officers
- Captain Oswald William McSheehy, Royal Army Medical Corps
- Major Charles Reynolds Mortimore, Sherwood Foresters (Nottinghamshire and Derbyshire Regiment)
- Major Edward Maurice Moulton-Barrett, Northumberland Fusiliers
- Major John Leslie Mowbray, Royal Artillery
- Major Vernon Monro Colquhoun Napier, Royal Regiment of Artillery
- Major Edward Harding Newman, Royal Regiment of Artillery
- Captain Oliver Henry North, Lancashire Fusiliers
- Captain Charles Ogston, Gordon Highlanders
- Captain Charles Samuel Owen, Royal Welsh Fusiliers
- Major Frank Page, Hertfordshire Regiment
- Major Alan Thomas Paley, Rifle Brigade
- Surgeon-Major Basil Pares, Royal Horse Guards
- Captain William Swynfen Whitehall Parker-Jervis, King's Royal Rifle Corps
- Captain Geoffrey Francis Phillips, Duke of Cornwall's Light Infantry
- Lieutenant-Colonel John Poe, Royal Army Medical Corps
- Major Josselyn Vere Ramsden, Royal Regiment of Artillery
- Major Anthony Julian Reddie, South Wales Borderers
- Captain Lewis Frederick Renny, Royal Dublin Fusiliers
- Temp. Captain Owen W. Richards FRCS LRCP, Royal Army Medical Corps
- Major Edward Vansittart Dick Riddell, Royal Regiment of Artillery
- Major Crofton Edward Pym Sankey, Royal Engineers
- Captain Francis Savage Nesbitt Savage-Armstrong, South Staffordshire Regiment
- Major James Alexander Scarlett, Royal Artillery
- Captain Charles Baliol Scott, Duke of Cornwall's Light Infantry
- Major Horace Somerville Sewell, 4th Royal Irish Dragoon Guards
- Major Herbert Stoney Smith, Leicestershire Regiment
- Captain Lionel Culme Soltau-Symons, Durham Light Infantry (attached Northumberland Fusiliers)
- Major Edward Anthony Steel, Royal Regiment of Artillery
- Major Henry Calvert Stanley-Clarke, Royal Regiment of Artillery
- Major Noel St Vincent Ramsey Stewart, 18th Queen Mary's Own Hussars
- Major Patrick Alexander Vansittart Stewart, King's Own Scottish Borderers
- Major Ian Stewart, Scottish Rifles
- Major John Henry Keith Stewart, Indian Army
- Major George Herbert Stobart, Royal Artillery
- Major John Arkwright Strick, King's Shropshire Light Infantry
- Major Henry Homes Sutherland, Black Watch (Royal Highlanders)
- Major Charles Bertie Owen Symons, Royal Engineers
- Captain James John Bonifant Tapley, Army Veterinary Corps
- Major Robert Joseph Atkinson Terry MVO, Royal Sussex Regiment
- Major William Brooke Thornton, Princess Charlotte of Wales's (Royal Berkshire Regiment)
- Captain Edward Guy Lethbridge Thurlow, Somerset Light Infantry
- Major William Herbert Trevor, East Kent Regiment
- Major Arthur Jervois Turner, Royal Regiment of Artillery
- Major David Keltie Tweedie, Royal Regiment of Artillery
- Major Edward Heron Varwell, Territorial Force, Wessex Divisional Signal Company
- Major Louis Ridley Vaughan, Indian Army
- Captain John Patrick Villiers-Stuart, Indian Army
- Captain Basil Walcot, Royal Engineers
- Major Henry Alexander Walker, Royal Fusiliers
- Major Harry Ward, Royal Regiment of Artillery
- Major Albert Lambert Ward, Honourable Artillery Company (Territorial Force)
- Brevet Major James Thorpe Weatherby, Oxfordshire and Buckinghamshire Light Infantry
- Major George Alexander Weir, 3rd Dragoon Guards
- Major Arthur Clement Wilkinson, Royal Regiment of Artillery
- Captain Frank Godfrey Willan, King's Royal Rifle Corps
- Major Eric Randal Gordon Wilmer, Royal Regiment of Artillery
- Major Henry Walter Wynter, Royal Regiment of Artillery
- Major Hugh Greville Young, Royal Regiment of Artillery

Canada

- Captain Christopher Geoffrey Arthur, 10th Canadian Battalion
- Lieutenant-Colonel William Watt Burland, 14th Canadian Battalion
- Major James Ballantine, 4th Canadian Battalion
- Captain Hugh Alexander Chisholm, Canadian Army Medical Corps
- Major Gilbert Godson-Godson, 16th Canadian Battalion
- Lieutenant-Colonel Hubert Kemmis Betty, 1st Canadian Division, Staff
- Lieutenant-Colonel Garnet Burk Hughes, 1st Canadian Division, Staff
- Major William Birchall Macaulay King, 10th Battery, 3rd Canadian Artillery Brigade
- Major Frederick Alexander Lister, Canadian Divisional Signal Company
- Lieutenant-Colonel Frederick Oscar Warren Loomis, 13th Canadian Battalion
- Major William Renwick Marshall, 15th Canadian Battalion
- Major Harold Halford Matthews, 8th Canadian Battalion
- Major George Seabrook Thomas Pragnell, 5th Canadian Battalion
- Captain James Howden MacBrien, 1st Canadian Division, Staff
- Captain Alexander Macphail, 1st Field Company, Canadian Engineers
- Captain Thomas Henry McKillip, Canadian Army Medical Corps
- Captain John Hegan Parks, 1st Canadian Battalion

British India

- Major Harry Beauchamp Douglas Baird, 12th Cavalry
- Captain Gerard William Burton, 39th Garhwal Rifles
- Captain Marmaduke Torin Cramer-Roberts, 4th Gurkha Rifles
- Lieutenant-Colonel Hugh Wilson Cruddas, 41st Dogras
- Captain John Acheson Staines Daniell, 14th King George's Own Ferozepore Sikhs (attached 15th Ludhiana Sikhs)
- Major John Arthur Hannyngton CMG, 129th Duke of Connaught's Own Baluchis
- Major Arthur Kyffin Heyland, Supply and Transport Corps
- Captain Arthur Thomas Sheringham, 121st Pioneers (attached 107th Pioneers)
- Captain John Taylor, Indian Medical Service (attached 39th Garhwal Rifles)
- Major Alexander Guthrie Thomson, 58th Vaughan's Rifles (Frontier Force)
- Major Thomas James Willans, 57th Wilde's Rifles (Frontier Force)

=== Distinguished Service Cross (DSC) ===
The King has been graciously pleased to give orders for the following award of the Distinguished Service Cross in respect of the undermentioned Officers, in recognition of their services with the Mediterranean Expeditionary Force.

- Lieutenant Ernest G. Boissier, Royal Naval Volunteer Reserve, Howe Battalion, Royal Naval Division.
- Lieutenant James Cheetham, Royal Marine Light Infantry, Chatham Battalion, Royal Marine Brigade, Royal Naval Division.
- Lieutenant George Spence Davidson, Royal Naval Volunteer Reserve, Anson Battalion, Royal Naval Division.

=== Military Cross (MC) ===
- The Rev. Wilfred Henry Abbot, Army Chaplains' Department, Church of England
- 2nd Lieutenant Alexander Ralph Abercrombie, Queen's (Royal West Surrey Regiment) (attached East Surrey Regiment)
- Lieutenant Viscount A. C. M. B. Acheson, Coldstream Guards
- The Rev. J. E. Adams, Army Chaplains' Department, Presbyterian
- Lieutenant J. C. Aitken, Argyll and Sutherland Highlanders (Princess Louise's)
- Lieutenant Trevor Rhys Allaway, South Wales Borderers (attached Welsh Regiment)
- Captain Henry Irving Ramsay Allfrey, Somerset Light Infantry
- 2nd Lieutenant W. Anderson, Northumberland Fusiliers
- Captain Robert Edward Anstruther, Black Watch (Royal Highlanders)
- 2nd Lieutenant R. A. Archer, Royal Regiment of Artillery (attached Royal Flying Corps)
- Captain W. F. Armstrong, Royal Regiment of Artillery
- Lieutenant J. C. Armstrong, Army Service Corps
- Captain Kenneth Hugh Lowden Arnott, East Lancashire Regiment
- Lieutenant B. G. Atkin, Manchester Regiment (attached West African Regiment)
- Captain James Hozier Gardiner Baird, Bedfordshire Regiment
- Sergeant-Major R. A. Baldwin, Essex Regiment
- Lieutenant G. W. Barclay, Rifle Brigade (Prince Consort's Own)
- Captain J. Bartholomew, Gordon Highlanders
- Captain H. H. Bateman, Royal Engineers
- 2nd Lieutenant J. F. Batten, Royal Regiment of Artillery
- Lieutenant John Alexander Langford Batten-Pooll, 5th Royal Irish Lancers
- Captain A. E. Beattie, Queen's (Royal West Surrey Regiment) (attached Nigeria Regiment)
- Captain Philip Sanders Lonsdale Beaver, Wiltshire Regiment (Duke of Edinburgh's)
- Lieutenant R. H. E. Bennett, Prince Albert's (Somerset Light Infantry)
- 2nd Lieutenant Cyril Ernest William Birkett, Prince Albert's (Somerset Light Infantry) (attached King's Royal Rifle Corps)
- Captain Arthur John Walcot Blencowe, Lancashire Fusiliers
- Captain Graham Bromhead Bosanquet, Gloucestershire Regiment
- Lieutenant Anthony Charles Stevens Bovill, Queen's Royal Lancers
- Company Sergeant-Major George Braid Bowstead, Special Reserve (Postal Section)
- Captain A. R. Boyle, Argyll and Sutherland Highlanders (Princess Louise's)
- Sergeant-Major T. Brasier, King's Royal Rifle Corps
- 2nd Lieutenant J. Brindley, East Yorkshire Regiment
- Captain Ralph Howard Broome, Wiltshire Regiment (Duke of Edinburgh's)
- Captain E. L. Brown, Suffolk Regiment
- Captain M. Browne, Duke of Cambridge's Own (Middlesex Regiment')
- Lieutenant Ian Meredith Bruce-Gardyne, Black Watch (Royal Highlanders)
- Captain Eric Wilson Buckler, Worcestershire Regiment
- Quartermaster and Honorary Lieutenant F. W. Burdett, Army Service Corps
- Lieutenant William Eric Newton Burlton, Prince of Wales's Volunteers (South Lancashire Regiment)
- Lieutenant Edmund Ernest Norbert Burney, Princess Charlotte of Wales's (Royal Berkshire Regiment)
- Lieutenant Arthur Gordon Cade, Duke of Cambridge's Own (Middlesex Regiment')
- Lieutenant Everard Earle Calthrop, Royal Engineers
- Captain Montagu Irving Mitchell Campbell, Connaught Rangers (attached Welsh Regiment)
- The Rev. Arthur Travellick Cape, Army Chaplains' Department, Wesleyan
- Lieutenant Edward Hamilton Carkeet-James, Duke of Cornwall's Light Infantry
- Captain T. H. Carlisle, Royal Regiment of Artillery
- Quartermaster and Honorary Lieutenant J. Carr, Royal Army Medical Corps, West Riding
- Regimental Sergeant-Major W. Carroll, Royal Irish Rifles
- 2nd Lieutenant Kenneth McClellan Cave, Royal Engineers
- Captain H. F. Chads, Border Regiment
- 2nd Lieutenant Roger James Ferguson Chance, Royal Horse Guards
- Captain John Clervaux Chaytor, South Staffordshire Regiment
- Lieutenant William McMeekin Chesney, Royal Army Medical Corps
- Captain John Arthur Childe-Freeman, Royal Welsh Fusiliers
- Sergeant-Major Willis Cholerton, York and Lancaster Regiment
- Lieutenant E. G. H. Clarke, East Surrey Regiment
- Mechanist Sergeant-Major C. Clements, Army Service Corps
- Lieutenant F. R. Cobb, Devonshire Regiment
- Captain The Hon. Edward Coke, Rifle Brigade (Prince Consort's Own) (attached London Regiment)
- Captain Percy Hugh Campbell Collins, York and Lancaster Regiment Edward
- Lieutenant Edmund Percy Combe, Royal Scots (Lothian Regiment)
- 2nd Lieutenant R. B. Comely, Monmouthshire Regiment
- Captain P. H. Compton, 6th Dragoon Guards (Carabiniers)
- Staff Sergeant-Major J. Connell, Army Service Corps
- Captain George Loyd Courthope, Royal Sussex Regiment
- Captain Stephen Howard Neal Coxon, Royal Warwickshire Regiment
- Capt. Herbert Charles Crozier, 1st Battalion, The Royal Dublin Fusiliers
- Temp. Lieutenant D. D. Craig, Royal Army Medical Corps
- Lieutenant Francis Savile Crossley, Queen's Royal Lancers
- Lieutenant Guy Lindsay Cruikshank, Royal Flying Corps, Gordon Highlanders
- Captain J. Dare, Loyal Forth Lancashire Regiment
- Captain W. Darling FRCS, Royal Army Medical Corps
- Lieutenant Thomas Herbert Darwell, East Surrey Regiment
- Sergeant-Major Vivian Hugh Stuart Davenport, Border Regiment
- Captain F. E. Davies, Worcestershire Regiment
- Captain G. F. Dawson, Royal Army Medical Corps (attached Royal Highlanders)
- Captain M. F. Day, King's Own (Yorkshire Light Infantry)
- Second Lieutenant Neville Lindney Clemond De Rinzy, East Yorkshire Regiment
- Lieutenant James Viner Delahaye, Royal Regiment of Artillery
- Lieutenant B. C. Dening, Royal Engineers
- Lieutenant Frederick Joseph Aglis Dibdin, Royal Sussex Regiment (attached Welsh Regiment)
- Lieutenant James MacNeece Dickie, Royal Dublin Fusiliers
- 2nd Lieutenant Cathcart Eric Stewart Dobbs, Army Service Corps
- Captain M. G. Douglas, Honourable Artillery Company (Territorial Force)
- Captain S. D. Douglas-Jones, Royal Regiment of Artillery
- Lieutenant Guy Percy Lumsden Drake-Brockman, Border Regiment
- 2nd Lieutenant William Draycott-Wood, South Staffordshire Regiment
- Lieutenant J. L. Drummond, Royal Scots Fusiliers
- The Rev. W. Drury, Army Chaplains' Department, Church of England
- Quartermaster and Honorary Lieutenant H. Dugdale, Royal Army Medical Corps, 3rd East Lancashire Field Ambulance
- Bandmaster W. J. Dunn, King's Royal Rifle Corps
- Captain P. Dwyer, Royal Army Medical Corps
- Lieutenant Oliver Pearce Edgcumbe, Duke of Cornwall's Light Infantry
- 2nd Lieutenant J. D. Edge, Royal Regiment of Artillery
- Captain Kenneth Essex Edgeworth, Royal Engineers
- Captain Charles O'Reilly Edwards, Royal Engineers
- Captain F. H. Edwards, Bedfordshire Regiment
- Captain A. H. Edwards, Monmouthshire Regiment
- Second Lieutenant J. H. Eliot, 3rd King's Own Hussars
- Lieutenant C. W. Evans, South Staffordshire Regiment
- Lieutenant R. J. V. Falkner, 4th Queen's Own Hussars
- 2nd Lieutenant Harry Wyndham Francis Blackburne Farrer, Royal Regiment of Artillery
- Lieutenant J. O. Farrer, King's Shropshire Light Infantry
- Captain R. T. Fellowes, Rifle Brigade
- Captain St. John Lucius O'Brien Acheson ffrench Blake, 21st Empress of India's Lancers
- Lieutenant G. A. Fisher, King's Royal Rifle Corps
- Lieutenant Conway Victor Fisher-Rowe, Grenadier Guards
- Captain Lord Desmond FitzGerald, Irish Guards
- Captain Edward Herbert Fitzherbert, Army Service Corps
- Lieutenant W. A. Fleming, Devonshire Regiment
- Captain I. G. Fleming, Gordon Highlanders
- Captain H. J. Flower, King's Royal Rifle Corps (attached London Regiment)
- Captain The Hon. Bertram Marmaduke Osbert Savile Foljambe, Prince of Wales's Own (West Yorkshire Regiment)
- Captain O. B. Foster, Northumberland Fusiliers
- Captain J. F. Franks, King's Royal Rifle Corps
- Captain Charles St Quentin Outen Fullbrook-Leggatt DSO, Princess Charlotte of Wales's (Royal Berkshire Regiment)
- Lieutenant H. M. Gale, Army Service Corps
- Lieutenant Gerald Ion Gartlan, Royal Irish Rifles
- 2nd Lieutenant J. Giffen, Queen's Own Cameron Highlanders
- 2nd Lieutenant R. Gillespie, King's Own Scottish Borderers
- Lieutenant H. R. Glen, Army Service Corps
- Captain Walter Hugh Godsal, Durham Light Infantry
- Captain Claude le Bas Goldney, Army Service Corps
- Captain Burford Henryson Goodhart, Wiltshire Regiment (Duke of Edinburgh's)
- Captain John Standish Surtees Prendergast Vereker, Viscount Gort MVO Grenadier Guards
- Lieutenant Kenneth Ian Gourlay, Royal Engineers
- Captain F. R. W. Graham, Royal Irish Rifles
- Captain Lord Douglas Malise Graham, Royal Artillery
- Captain F. N. Grant, Royal Sussex Regiment
- 2nd Lieutenant Walter Stuart Wingate Gray, Royal Regiment of Artillery
- Captain Eric Beresford Greer, Irish Guards
- Captain The Hon. Richard Eustace Grosvenor, Royal Regiment of Artillery
- Lieutenant Benjamin George Gunner, Northumberland Fusiliers
- Captain H. W. Hall, 2nd Dragoon Guards (Queen's Bays)
- Captain F. A. C. Hamilton, Cameronians (Scottish Rifles)
- Lieutenant Walter Francis Hanna, Royal Engineers
- 2nd Lieutenant G. H. Harbord, Royal Regiment of Artillery (attached 1st Canadian Division)
- Captain H. S. Hardy, Buffs (East Kent Regiment)
- Quartermaster and Honorary Lieutenant C. E. Harford, Royal Horse Guards
- Captain G. E. Hawes, Royal Fusiliers (City of London Regiment) (attached London Regiment)
- Captain Mansell William Lamb Hawkes, Royal Munster Fusiliers
- Captain John Richardson Heelis, Manchester Regiment
- Captain O. C. Herbert, Argyll and Sutherland Highlanders
- Captain H. W. Herring, Royal Engineers
- Lieutenant William George Hewett, Welsh Regiment
- Captain R. Hewlett, Royal Fusiliers (City of London Regiment)
- Temp. Lieutenant F. T. Hill, Royal Army Medical Corps
- Lieutenant James Wilfred Lang Stanley Hobart, Prince of Wales's (North Staffordshire Regiment)
- 2nd Lieutenant J. Hobbs, Royal Scots (Lothian Regiment)
- Lieutenant J. F. Hodges, Royal Irish Fusiliers (Princess Victoria's)
- Sergeant-Major C. Hodgkinson, Worcestershire Regiment
- Captain Herbert Arthur Reginald Hoffmeister, King's Shropshire Light Infantry
- Lieutenant U. S. Holden, Army Service Corps
- Acting Sergeant-Major R. M. Holmes, 1st (King's) Dragoon Guards
- Lieutenant Lord Hans Wellesley Holmpatrick, 16th The Queen's Lancers
- Captain R. Horn, Seaforth Highlanders (Ross-shire Buffs, Duke of Albany's)
- Captain H. L. Howell, Royal Army Medical Corps
- Lieutenant L. J. Hudleston, Duke of Cambridge's Own (Middlesex Regiment')
- Captain William Tyers Christopher Huffam, Prince of Wales's Own (West Yorkshire Regiment)
- Captain A. J. Hunter, King's Royal Rifle Corps
- Captain R. H. Husey, London Regiment, 5th Battalion (London Rifle Brigade)
- Captain H. O. Hutchison, Royal Regiment of Artillery
- Lieutenant T. J. Hutton, Royal Regiment of Artillery
- 2nd Lieutenant T. Hutton, Duke of Wellington's (West Riding Regiment)
- Captain Edward Hastings Impey, Lincolnshire Regiment
- Captain C. D. Irwin, Manchester Regiment
- Lieutenant B. T. James, Royal Flying Corps, Royal Engineers
- Temp. Lieutenant P. W. James, Royal Army Medical Corps
- Temp. Lieutenant H. G. Janion, Royal Army Medical Corps
- Lieutenant Frederick Oliver St. John, Royal Scots (Lothian Regiment) (attached 35th Divisional Signal Company)
- Captain H. H. Joll, Royal Regiment of Artillery
- Captain J. B. Jones, Royal Army Medical Corps
- Captain E. J. Kavanagh, Royal Army Medical Corps
- The Rev. William Keatinge, Army Chaplains' Department, Roman Catholic
- Lieutenant W. Kerr, Border Regiment
- Capt. Horace Augustus Kirby, Royal Artillery (26th Jacob's Mountain Battery)
- Sergeant-Major J. Kirk, Irish Guards
- Captain Charles Leycester Knyvett, Royal Regiment of Artillery
- 2nd Lieutenant F. P. Lacy, Territorial Force (Westmorland and Cumberland Yeomanry)
- Captain R. W. Lamb, Royal Regiment of Artillery
- 2nd Lieutenant John Frederick Lascelles, Royal Flying Corps, Rifle Brigade
- Lieutenant George Alexander Ledingham, Royal Engineers
- Captain G. Lee, Buffs (East Kent Regiment)
- Captain G. M. Lee, Royal Fusiliers (City of London Regiment)
- Captain C. S. Linton, Worcestershire Regiment
- Lieutenant C. M. Lister, Royal Regiment of Artillery
- Temp. Lieutenant W. H. Lister, Royal Army Medical Corps
- Captain A. M. O. J. Lloyd, South Wales Borderers
- Lieutenant H. C. Lloyd, King's Royal Rifle Corps
- Captain C. C. Lucas, Royal Artillery
- Captain L. W. Lucas, Buffs (East Kent Regiment)
- Captain S. T. Lucey, Loyal North Lancashire Regiment
- Captain The Hon. Robert Lygon MVO, Grenadier Guards
- Captain A. I. Macdougall, 5th Royal Irish Lancers
- Temp. Lieutenant I. C. Maclean, Royal Army Medical Corps
- Capt. Jasper Kenneth Gordon Magee, 4th Australian Infantry Battalion (New South Wales).
- Temp. 2nd Lieutenant Thomas Bertram Joseph Mahar, King's Royal Rifle Corps
- Lieutenant James Francis Marsland, Prince of Wales's Leinster Regiment (Royal Canadians)
- Lieutenant Giffard Le Quesne Martel, Royal Engineers
- Lieutenant A. Maxwell, Royal Regiment of Artillery
- Captain B. McKinnell, King's (Liverpool Regiment)
- Lieutenant W. S. Meeke, Duke of Cambridge's Own (Middlesex Regiment) (attached Royal Munster Fusiliers)
- Captain John Vincent Meredith, Prince of Wales's Leinster Regiment (Royal Canadians)
- Captain Hugh Mowbray Meyler, Duke of Cambridge's Own (Middlesex Regiment')
- Lieutenant G. W. Miller, King's (Liverpool Regiment)
- 2nd Lieutenant F. Milnes, 2nd Dragoon Guards (Queen's Bays)
- 2nd Lieutenant R. G. Moir, Argyll and Sutherland Highlanders (Princess Louise's)
- Lieutenant Charles Willoughby Moke Norrie, 11th Prince Albert's Own Hussars
- The Rev. John Patrick Molony, Army Chaplains' Department, Roman Catholic
- Sergeant-Major J. Moore, King's Own (Yorkshire Light Infantry)
- 2nd Lieutenant A. R. Moore, London Regiment, 4th Battalion (Royal Fusiliers)
- Captain Howel Gwyn Moore-Gwyn, Rifle Brigade (Prince Consort's Own)
- Second Lieutenant D. N. Morgan, Royal Regiment of Artillery
- 2nd Lieutenant F. J. Morley, Dorsetshire Regiment
- 2nd Lieutenant C. H. Morris, Dorsetshire Regiment
- Captain Edward F. Moulton-Barrett, Queen's Own Royal West Kent Regiment
- Second Lieutenant Dennis Joseph St. Claire Mullaly, Royal Regiment of Artillery
- 2nd Lieutenant John Hardy Musson, Queen's (Royal West Surrey Regiment)
- Captain F. A. Nicolson, 15th The King's Hussars
- Captain Humphrey Donatus Stafford O'Brien, Northamptonshire Regiment (attached Nigeria Regiment)
- 2nd Lieutenant Wilfred Francis Lann Oliver, Durham Light Infantry
- Captain W. L. Palmer, 10th Hussars
- Lieutenant Ashley Pole Pargiter, Royal Irish Regiment
- 2nd Lieutenant A. J. Parkes, Royal Engineers
- Sergeant-Major O. W. Parkinson, Suffolk Regiment
- Captain R. E. Partridge, Dorsetshire Regiment
- Lieutenant J. Paterson, London Regiment, 14th Battalion (London Scottish)
- Lieutenant R. W. Patteson, Norfolk Regiment
- Captain Guy Barnett Pears, Royal Engineers
- Sergeant-Major J. Pell, Dorsetshire Regiment
- 2nd Lieutenant James William Pendlebury, East Lancashire Regiment
- Captain J. Penrose, Royal Regiment of Artillery
- Capt. Arthur Guy Leslie Pepys, 1st Battalion, The Essex Regiment.
- Captain Francis George Prescot Philips, King's Shropshire Light Infantry (attached Manchester Regiment)
- Captain R. Pigot, Rifle Brigade (Prince Consort's Own)
- Captain Ebenezer John Lecky Pike, Grenadier Guards
- Captain Robert Henry Pipon, Royal Fusiliers (City of London Regiment)
- Captain Henry Chambre Ponsonby, King's Royal Rifle Corps
- The Rev. A. E. Popham, Army Chaplains' Department, Church of England
- Lieutenant D. H. Pratt, Royal Irish Regiment
- Captain F. Preedy, Royal Engineers
- Lieutenant R. A. Preston, Royal Army Medical Corps
- Lieutenant G. E. R Prior, Devonshire Regiment
- Regimental Sergeant-Major W. Pritchard, Devonshire Regiment
- Captain H. M. Pryce-Jones, Coldstream Guards
- Captain L. C. Rattray, King's Royal Rifle Corps
- Captain A. K. Reid, Highland Light Infantry
- Capt. Clifford Russell Richardson, 2nd Australian Infantry Battalion (New South Wales).
- Captain E. D. Ridley, Grenadier Guards
- Lieutenant Robert Collingwood H. Roddam, Northumberland Fusiliers
- Captain W. K. Rollo, Alexandra Princess of Wales's Own (Yorkshire Regiment)
- Captain R. H. Rowe, Royal Regiment of Artillery
- Captain H. K. Sadler, Royal Regiment of Artillery
- Captain Samuel John Marton Sampson, London Regiment, 9th Battalion (Queen Victoria's Rifles)
- Captain A. L. Samson, Royal Welsh Fusiliers
- Sergeant-Major H. Savill, Royal Fusiliers (City of London Regiment)
- 2nd Lieutenant O. W. Sherwell, Royal Regiment of Artillery
- Captain L. F. Smeathman, Hertfordshire Regiment
- Temp. Lieutenant P. Smith, Royal Army Medical Corps
- Honorary Lieutenant S. N. Smith, Army Ordnance Department
- Captain H. J. Solomon, Army Service Corps
- Captain W. M. Sutton, Prince Albert's (Somerset Light Infantry)
- Staff Sergeant-Major W. E. Spalding, Army Service Corps
- Honorary Captain Percy William Montague Sparey, Army Ordnance Department
- Captain F. A. Spencer, Army Service Corps
- Lieutenant J. H. Stafford, Royal Engineers
- Lieutenant R. N. Stewart, Queen's Own Cameron Highlanders
- Lieutenant G. H. Straker, 15th Hussars
- Captain John William Cotter Stubbs, Royal Army Medical Corps
- Lieutenant R. H. Studdert, Royal Regiment of Artillery
- 2nd Lieutenant A. Sutherland, Queen's Own Cameron Highlanders
- Captain Charles Francis Trollope Swan, Rifle Brigade (Prince Consort's Own)
- Lieutenant Alan Henry Campbell Swinton, Scots Guards
- Captain F. S. Thackeray, Highland Light Infantry
- Captain Charles Robert Thropp Thorp, King's Own (Yorkshire Light Infantry) (Signal Service)
- Captain Stuart Harman Joseph Thunder, Northamptonshire Regiment
- 2nd Lieutenant E. F. Tickell, Royal Engineers
- Captain J. E. Tindall, Territorial Force, 1st Home Counties Field Company
- Lieutenant W. G. Tolson, Oxfordshire and Buckinghamshire Light Infantry
- Captain C. T. Tomes, Royal Warwickshire Regiment
- Quartermaster and Honorary Captain F. Tomlinson, Sherwood Foresters (Nottinghamshire and Derbyshire Regiment)
- Captain William Tidswell Towers-Clark, Coldstream Guards
- Lieutenant J. S. Townshend, South Staffordshire Regiment
- Captain Derrick le Poer Trench, Royal Regiment of Artillery
- Lieutenant J. A. Turner, Royal Regiment of Artillery
- Lieutenant R. M. Vaughan, Royal Flying Corps, Royal Inniskilling Fusiliers
- Captain G. E. Vaughan, Coldstream Guards
- Captain H. F. Vellacott FRCS, Royal Army Medical Corps
- Captain Walter King Venning, Duke of Cornwall's Light Infantry (attached London Regiment)
- Captain William Henry McNeile Verschoyle-Campbell, Army Ordnance Department, Royal Artillery
- 2nd Lieutenant N. M. Vibart, Royal Engineers
- Captain A. C. Vicary, Gloucestershire Regiment
- 2nd Lieutenant Bentley Herbert Waddy, Gloucestershire Regiment (attached Bedfordshire Regiment)
- Sergeant-Major G. B. Walker, Royal Army Medical Corps
- Lieutenant C. J. Wallace, Highland Light Infantry
- Captain H. W. L. Waller, Royal Artillery
- Captain M. R. Walsh, Worcestershire Regiment
- Lieutenant Frederic Angus Wanklyn, Royal Flying Corps, Royal Artillery
- Captain Edward Courtenay Thomas Warner, Scots Guards
- 2nd Lieutenant R. A. Watson, Royal Regiment of Artillery
- Captain J. Watson, Royal Engineers
- Captain A. P. Wavell, Royal Highlanders
- Lieutenant Marshall William Traheme Webb, Royal Engineers
- Captain D. L. Weir, Leicestershire Regiment
- Lieutenant T. Wells, King's Own (Yorkshire Light Infantry)
- Lieutenant J. S. T. Weston, Royal Warwickshire Regiment (attached Royal Berkshire Regiment)
- 2nd Lieutenant George Ferris Whidborne, Coldstream Guards
- Captain F. S. Whinney, Lincolnshire Regiment
- Captain N. T. Whitehead, Royal Army Medical Corps
- Lieutenant J. L. Whitty, Prince of Wales's Leinster Regiment (Royal Canadians)
- Lieutenant James Lugard Willcocks, Royal Highlanders
- Captain E. C. T. B. Williams, Suffolk Regiment
- Captain Edward William G. Wilson, Royal Regiment of Artillery
- 2nd Lieutenant M. D. Wilson, Queen's (Royal West Surrey Regiment) (attached Lincolnshire Regiment)
- Captain H. G. Winter, Royal Army Medical Corps
- Captain A. B. Woodgate, King's Own (Royal Lancaster Regiment)
- Captain R. H. Woods, King's Royal Rifle Corps
- Staff Sergeant-Major W. W. Woods, Army Service Corps
- Captain Charles de Witte Woodyer, Cheshire Regiment
- Captain J. H. Young, Argyll and Sutherland Highlanders (Princess Louise's)

Canada

- Captain G. M. Alexander, 15th Canadian Battalion
- Captain Alfred Kimball Haywood, Medical Corps (attached 3rd Canadian Battalion)
- Lieutenant Colville Eyre Crabbe, Princess Patricia's Canadian Light Infantry
- Lieutenant Halfdan Fenton Harboe Hertzberg, 2nd Field Company, Canadian Engineers
- Captain Josiah Sherlock Marrington Arthur Haigh Lyne-Evans, 3rd Canadian Battalion
- Lieutenant Norman George Morrison McLeod, 8th Canadian Battalion
- Lieutenant James Herbert Scandrett, 12th Battery, 3rd Canadian Artillery Brigade
- Lieutenant J. M. Scott, 8th Canadian Battalion
- Captain A. G. Turner, 2nd Canadian Battalion
- Lieutenant Ralph Webb, Canadian Army Service Corps
- Regimental Sergeant-Major J. Jeffrey, 13th Canadian Battalion

British India

- Lieutenant A. E. Barstow, 15th Ludhiana Sikhs
- Captain Basil de Lisle Brock, 126th Baluchistan Infantry
- Lieutenant Frederick Cromie de Butts, 55th Coke's Rifles (Frontier Force) (attached 31st (Divisional Signal) Company)
- Lieutenant Ernle James Corse-Scott, 2nd King Edward's Own Gurkha Rifles (Sirmoor Rifles)
- Lieutenant E. K. Fowler, 57th Wilde's Rifles (Frontier Force)
- Lieutenant Forrester Metcalfe Griffith-Griffin, 129th Duke of Connaught's Own Baluchis
- Captain Meredith Ashton Hamer, 129th Duke of Connaught's Own Baluchis
- Captain Ernest Frederick John Hill, 1st King George's Own Sappers and Miners, Royal Engineers
- Captain Percy Cleghorn Stanley Hobart, 1st King George's Own Sappers and Miners, Royal Engineers
- Captain G. Howson, 4th Cavalry
- Captain C. E. Hunt, 34th Sikh Pioneers
- Subadar Arsla Khan IOM, 57th Wilde's Rifles (Frontier Force)
- Lieutenant H. V. Lewis, 129th Duke of Connaught's Own Baluchis
- Lieutenant Eugene Lancelot Erskine Lindop, 41st Dogras
- Captain E. B. Mangin, 107th Pioneers
- Lieutenant Henry John Minniken, West India Regiment (attached West African Regiment)
- Lieutenant Charles Francis Fitzgerald Moore, 123rd Outram's Rifles (attached 4th Gurkha Rifles)
- Jemadar Sangram Singh Negi, 39th Garhwal Rifles
- Lieutenant J. Nethersole, 25th Cavalry (Frontier Force) (attached 2nd Life Guards)
- Captain J. S. O'Neill, Indian Medical Service
- Captain W. Odell, 123rd Outram's Rifles (attached 125th Napier Rifles
- Jemadar Bishan Singh Rawat, 39th Garhwal Rifles
- Lieutenant John Allan Mackay Scobie, 59th Scinde Rifles (Frontier Force)
- 2nd Class Sub-Assistant Surgeon Ramkrishna Ganpat Shinde, Indian Medical Service (attached 39th Garhwal Rifles)
- Captain A. D. Smith, 2nd King Edward's Own Gurkha Rifles (Sirmoor Rifles)
- Lieutenant Francis Benton Newport Tinley, 20th Deccan Horse
- Lieutenant Harold Lithgow Watkis, 37th Lancers (Baluch Horse)

=== Conspicuous Gallantry Medal (CGM) ===
- Chief Petty Officer Richard Farley Toy, Howe Battalion.
- Able Seaman George Henry Doe, Howe Battalion.
- Private Charles J. Braddock, Royal Marine Light Infantry, RFRB, Chatham Battalion.
- Bugler Ernest Sillence, Royal Marine Light Infantry, Chatham Battalion.

=== Distinguished Service Medal (DSM) ===
- Petty Officer Walter Mason, Drake Battalion.
- Leading Seaman John Rogerson, Anson Battalion.
- Stoker Herbert Horace Purnell, Hood Battalion.
- Sgt. N. Roberts, Royal Marine Light Infantry, Field Ambulance.
- Private George Stockham, Royal Naval Auxiliary Sick Berth Reserve, Plymouth Battalion.

=== Distinguished Conduct Medal (DCM) ===
Citation —His Majesty the KING has been graciously pleased to approve of the award to the undermentioned Warrant Officers, Non-commissioned Officers and Men, for acts of gallantry and devotion to duty whilst serving with the Expeditionary Force in France and Flanders:

- Company-Sergeant-Major E. W. Abbott, 1st Battalion, Hertfordshire Regiment
- Lance-Sergeant G. A. Abbott, 1st Battalion, Middlesex Regiment
- Signaller-Sergeant E. A. Adams, 5th City of London Battalion, London Regiment (London Rifle Brigade)
- Private H. M. Adams, Canadian Signal Company
- Private W. Adams, 2nd Battalion, South Wales Borderers (recently of the 1st Battalion)
- Acting Sergeant S. L. Adamson, 3rd Canadian Battalion
- Gunner G. Addisson, 45th Battery, Royal Field Artillery
- Private C. Allen, 2nd Battalion, South Staffordshire Regiment
- Lance-Corporal G. W. Allan, 10th Canadian Battalion
- Lance-Corporal D. Allison, 9th (Glasgow Highland) Battalion, Highland Light Infantry
- Corporal W. Amison, 1st Battalion, North Staffordshire Regiment
- Lance-Corporal G. Anderson, 1/5th (Angus and Dundee) Battalion, Royal Highlanders
- Bandsman J. Anderson, 1st Battalion, Middlesex Regiment
- Company-Sergeant-Major A. A. Anderton, Army Service Corps
- Acting Company-Quartermaster Serjeant A. Andrews, 2nd Battalion, Highland Light Infantry
- Private H. J. Andrews, 2nd Battalion, Scottish Rifles (attached 8th Signal Company)
- Sergeant A. Archibald, 6th (Banff and Donside) Battalion, Gordon Highlanders
- Company-Serjeaut-Major F. Ariss, 1st Battalion, Royal Warwickshire Regiment
- Sergeant J. Arthur, 2nd Battalion, Cameron Highlanders
- Sergeant W. Ashworth, 1st Battalion, Liverpool Regiment
- Company-Sergeant-Major C. Asplin, 2nd Battalion, Northamptonshire Regiment
- Lance-Corporal E. J. Austin, 2nd Battalion, Grenadier Guards
- Second Corporal G. Austin, 59th Company, Royal Engineers
- Staff-Sergeant-Major F. C. Avis, Army Service Corps
- Sergeant W. Badcock, 1st Battalion, Shropshire Light Infantry
- Private W. H. Baker, 2nd Battalion, Lancashire Fusiliers
- Private W. Ball, 2nd Battalion, Grenadier Guards
- Lance-Corporal J. Barber, 2nd Battalion, Essex Regiment
- Sergeant E. A. Barnes, 26th Field Company, Royal Engineers
- Private C. Barry, 2nd Battalion, Royal Munster Fusiliers
- Acting Corporal W. Bartlett, 2nd Battalion, Bedfordshire Regiment
- Private C. W. Batchelor, 2nd Canadian Battalion
- Sergeant V. Batty, 2nd Battalion, Royal Lancaster Regiment
- Lance-Corporal J. Beagin, 1/7th Battalion, Worcestershire Regiment
- Sergeant J. Bean, Army Service Corps
- Private F. Beaney, 8th Divisional Cyclist Company, Army Cyclist Corps (late Rifle Brigade)
- Acting Company Sergeant-Major R. Bell, 1st Battalion, Highland Light Infantry
- Gunner E. Bennett, 15th Brigade, Royal Field Artillery
- Private G. Bennett, 1/5th Battalion, North Staffordshire Regiment
- Company-Quartermaster-Sergeant J. H. Bennett, 2nd Battalion, Rifle Brigade
- Corporal B. Benton, 9th Field Company, Royal Engineers
- Lance-Corporal J. Berry, 2nd Battalion, Highland Light Infantry
- Acting Bombardier A. Beswick, 73rd Battery, Royal Field Artillery
- Corporal W. H. Bethell, 55th Field Company, Royal Engineers
- Sergeant R. W. Biart, 5th Signal Company, Royal Engineers
- Private R. Binks, 2nd Battalion, King's Royal Rifle Corps
- Private R. W Birdseye, 2nd Canadian Battalion
- Corporal E. Bishop, 54th Battery, Royal Field Artillery
- Acting Company-Sergeant-Major W. Blackman, 2nd Battalion, East Surrey Regiment
- Lance-Corporal R. Blakernan, 1st Battalion, Worcestershire Regiment
- Private W. Blanton, 2nd Battalion, Cheshire Regiment,
- Private T. J. Bloomfield, 2nd Battalion, West Yorkshire Regiment
- Private C. H. Bloxham, 10th Canadian Battalion
- Sergeant F. W. Borley, 1st Battalion, Royal Irish Fusiliers
- Corporal F. Bowler, 2nd Battalion, Nottinghamshire and Derbyshire Regiment
- Lance-Corporal E. Boxall, 2nd Battalion, Royal Munster Fusiliers
- Company Sergeant-Major T. Brannan, 1st Battalion, Royal Scots (Lothian Regiment)
- Sergeant P. Breach, 2nd Battalion, Oxfordshire and Buckinghamshire Light-Infantry
- Sapper W. H. Brett, 9th Field Company, Royal Engineers
- Private C. Briggs, 2nd Battalion, Lincolnshire Regiment
- Private C. J. Brooks, 1st Battalion, Royal Scots Fusiliers
- Sergeant J. Brooks, 2nd Battalion, Royal Munster Fusiliers
- Company Sergeant-Major A. Brown, 1st Battalion, East Kent Regiment
- Sapper A. C. Brown, 11th Field Company, Royal Engineers
- Sergeant A. S. Brown, 2nd Battalion, Bedfordshire Regiment
- Sergeant F. C. Brown, NCable Section, Royal Engineers
- Lance-Corporal O. J. Brown, 1st Northumbrian Field Company, Royal Engineers
- Sergeant T. M. Brown, Canadian Army Medical Corps
- Sergeant W. Brown, 110th Battery, Royal Field Artillery
- Acting Lance-Corporal A. Brownley, 1st Battalion, Lincolnshire Regiment
- Lance-Corporal C. Brownlow, 1st Battalion, East Yorkshire Regiment
- Private E. Bunsell, 1st Battalion, Royal West Kent Regiment
- Sergeant E. C. Burgess, 9th County of London Battalion, London Regiment (Queen Victoria's Rifles)
- Acting Sergeant T. Burgess, 116th Battery, Royal Field Artillery
- Acting Sergeant G. Burnett, 1st Battalion, Royal Highlanders
- Pioneer G. P. Burns, 1st Signal Co., Royal Engineers
- Private G. Burrell, 7th Battalion, Northumberland Fusiliers
- Private J. Burridge, 2nd Battalion, Welsh Regiment
- Sergeant E. F. Burrows, 2nd Battalion, Royal Berkshire Regiment
- Sergeant A. Busby, 2nd Battalion, South Staffordshire Regiment
- Acting Company Sergeant-Major B. Butcher, 2nd Battalion, Royal Sussex Regiment
- Gunner A. Butler, 1st Siege Battery, Royal Garrison Artillery
- Sergeant E. Butler, 1st Battalion, North Staffordshire Regiment
- Lance-Corporal F. Butler, 1st Battalion, Royal Berkshire Regiment
- Private F. R. Butler, 1st Battalion, Northamptonshire Regiment
- Private C. Button, 1st Battalion, West Yorkshire Regiment
- Company Quartermaster-Sergeant F. O. Bytheway, 1st Battalion, South Staffordshire Regiment
- Lance-Corporal H. Cairns, 1st Battalion, Royal Irish Rifles
- Sergeant J. M. Calder, 15th Canadian Battalion
- Acting Corporal A. Carey, 1st Battalion, Cheshire Regiment
- Private J. Carr, 2nd Battalion, Lancashire Fusiliers
- Sergeant R. H. Carr (now Second Lieutenant in Special Reserve of Officers), Royal Flying Corps
- Acting Sergeant F. Carrington, 2nd Battalion, West Riding Regiment
- Sergeant T. B. Carter (19th Field Ambulance), Royal Army Medical Corps
- Private J. Cartwright, 14th Field Ambulance), Royal Army Medical Corps
- Lance-Corporal R. J. Casement, 1st Field Company, Canadian Engineers
- Corporal S. Cassell, 21st Battery, Royal Field Artillery
- Corporal E. Casstles, Canadian Signal Company
- Sapper H. G. Catlin, 15th Field Company, Royal Engineers
- Private G. O. Chadderton, 4th Battalion, Northumberland Fusiliers
- Sapper S. M. Chapman, 1st General Headquarters. Signal Company, Royal Engineers
- Corporal A. Charley, 42nd Brigade, Royal Field Artillery
- Private W. H. Charman, 2nd Battalion, East Lancashire Regiment
- Sergeant W. Chart, 1st Battalion, Nottinghamshire and Derbyshire Regiment
- Lance-Corporal H. Chawk, 2nd Battalion, Gordon Highlanders
- Sapper W. Chorlerton, 5th Field Company, Royal Engineers
- Sergeant A. Christie, 1/5th (Angus and Dundee) Battalion, Royal Highlanders
- Private G. Church, 2nd Battalion, Welsh Regiment
- Corporal J. Clarkburn, 1st Battalion, Northumberland Fusiliers
- Private G. Clarke, 3rd Battalion, Worcestershire Regiment
- Sergeant J. Clarke, 1st Battalion, Northumberland Fusiliers
- Gunner J. S. Clarke, Motor Machine Gun Service
- Company-Sergeant-Major G. E. Clay, 3rd Battalion, King's Royal Rifle Corps
- Sergeant S.-O. Clements, 9th Field Company, Royal Engineers
- Lance-Corporal A. Cleveland, 2nd Battalion, South Lancashire Regiment
- Sergeant-Major A. E. Clifton, Canadian Army Medical Corps
- Private S. C. Climpson, 2nd Battalion, Northamptonshire Regiment (attached 8th Signal Company)
- Acting Bombardier S. D. Collier, 109th Heavy Battery, Royal Garrison Artillery
- Company-Quartermaster-Sergeant C. H. Collins, 4th Division Cyclist Company, Army Cyclist Corps (late Hampshire Regiment)
- Private E. Collins, 1st Battalion, Hampshire Regiment
- Gunner C. Cooke, 36th Brigade, Royal Field Artillery
- Acting Sergeant W. Cooke, 2nd Battalion, Royal Dublin Fusiliers
- Sergeant J. Coombe, 5th Battalion, Durham Light Infantry
- Bombardier B. Coombes, 27th Brigade, Royal Field Artillery
- Bombardier E. G. Cooper, 32nd Brigade, Royal Field Artillery
- Private A. Copeland, 1st Battalion, Royal Irish Rifles
- Sergeant R. H. Cornall, 51st Battery, Royal Field Artillery
- Company-Sergeant-Major T. Corry, 1st Battalion, Irish Guards
- Lance-Corporal H. Cotterill, 2nd Battalion, South Staffordshire Regiment
- Acting Lance-Sergeant W. Coulson, 1st Battalion, Lincolnshire Regiment
- Bandsman J. Counter, 1st Battalion, Argyll and Sutherland Highlanders
- Corporal J. Cowan, 2nd Battalion, Argyll and Sutherland Highlanders
- Private J. D. Cowell, 5th Canadian Battalion
- Sergeant J. Coyle, 1st Battalion, Royal Irish Rifles
- Private J. Coyne, 9th (Dumbartonshire) Battalion, Argyll and Sutherland Highlanders
- Private W. Craig, 1st Battalion, Coldstream Guards
- Sergeant J. Crane, 2nd Battalion, Royal Munster Fusiliers
- Private J. Crawford, 2nd Battalion, Highland Light Infantry
- Lance-Corporal W. H. Critchley, 2nd Battalion, King's Royal Rifle Corps
- Sergeant H. Crook, 1st Battalion, King's Own Yorkshire Light Infantry
- Sergeant F. Cross, 1st Battalion, West Yorkshire Regiment
- Bombardier F. J. Cubitt, 3rd Battery, Royal Field Artillery
- Private R. Cully, 1st Battalion, Leinster Regiment
- Sergeant J. B. Cumper, 55th Field Company, Royal Engineers
- Company-Sergeant-Major A. Curtis, 2nd Battalion, Rifle Brigade
- Company-Sergeant-Major J. Dallaway, 2nd Battalion, Royal Sussex Regiment
- Lance-Corporal E. Dalton, 3rd Battalion, Coldstream Guards (transferred to 170th Company, Royal Engineers)
- Acting Corporal H. J. Daniels, 28th Divisional Cyclist Company, Army Cyclist Corps (late Suffolk Regiment)
- Corporal T. Daniels, 14th Brigade, Royal Horse Artillery
- Private H. Danson, 13th Canadian Battalion
- Lance-Corporal M. Darcy, 1st Battalion, Royal Irish Rifles
- Private H. C. A. Davidge, 1st Battalion, Cameron Highlanders
- Sergeant H. Davidson, 24th Heavy Battery, Royal Garrison Artillery
- Sergeant C. Davies, 6th Battalion, Royal Fusiliers (attached 4th Battalion)
- Corporal F. Davis, 11th Field Company, Royal Engineers
- Sergeant-Major J. J. Dawkins, 2nd Battalion, Royal Warwickshire Regiment
- Corporal C. Dawson, 1st Battalion, Northumberland Fusiliers
- Private J. Dempsey, 2nd Battalion, Suffolk Regiment
- Acting Sergeant E. Dennington, 1st Battalion, Royal West Kent Regiment
- Company Sergeant-Major W. S. Dingley, 1st Battalion, Duke of Cornwall's Light Infantry
- Corporal W. Dobbie, Royal Flying Corps
- Private J. Dodd, 3rd Battalion, King's Royal Rifle Corps
- Private J. Dodds, 5th Battalion, Northumberland Fusiliers
- Acting Corporal W. B. N. Doran, 33rd Battery, Royal Field Artillery
- Sergeant J. Dougall, 16th Canadian Battalion
- Private G. H. Dove, 2nd Battalion, West Yorkshire Regiment
- Bombardier E. O. Downing, Royal Field Artillery
- Acting Sergeant T. Drew, 23rd Battery, Royal Field Artillery
- Lance-Corporal G. J. Driver, 12th Field Company, Royal Engineers
- Sergeant W. H. Dryden, 7th Canadian Battalion
- Sergeant W. Duddridge, 1st Battalion, Gloucestershire Regiment
- Lance-Corporal J. W. Duffy, 56th Company, Royal Engineers
- Sapper A. J. Dugdale, 1st Home Counties Field Company, Royal Engineers
- Sergeant W. H. Dugmore, 2nd Battalion, Shropshire Light Infantry
- Bombardier J. F. Duley, 364th Battery, Royal Field Artillery
- Private W. Duncan, Canadian Signal Company
- Private W. Eade, 2nd Battalion, Bedfordshire Regiment
- Corporal T. Earnshaw, 1st Battalion, King's Own Yorkshire Light Infantry
- Sergeant F. Eccles, 2nd Battalion, Royal Munster Fusiliers
- Acting Corporal J. Edwards, 1st Battalion, South Wales Borderers
- Private W. Ellingham, 1st Battalion, Northumberland Fusiliers
- 3rd Class Assistant Surgeon K. P. Elloy, Indian Subordinate Medical Department
- Sapper W. W. Fairless, 1st Northumbrian Field Company, Royal Engineers
- Sergeant A. E. Faithfull, 28th Divisional Signal Company, Royal Engineers
- Acting Regimental Quartermaster-Sergeant G. Farrant, 1st Battalion, Gordon Highlanders
- Sergeant C. E. J. Faulkner, 2nd Battalion, Middlesex Regiment
- Company Quartermaster-Sergeant J. Fearnehough, 2nd Battalion, South Lancashire Regiment
- Acting Corporal E. Felgate, 4th Battalion, Rifle Brigade
- Lance-Corporal H. Ferguson, 1st Battalion, Royal Scots Fusiliers
- Laiice-Corporal W. Ferrill, 2nd Battalion, King's Royal Rifle Corps
- Sapper H. J. Ferris, "O" Cable Section, Royal Engineers
- Sergeant J. Finnigan, 2nd Battalion, Welsh Regiment
- Lance-Corporal T. Flanagan, 1st Battalion, Shropshire Light Infantry
- Private T. Foley, 1st Battalion, Cheshire Regiment
- Company Sergeant-Major W. G. Foster, 4th Battalion, Royal Fusiliers
- Sergeant (now Warrant Officer, Class II) E. Fox, 2nd Battalion, Yorkshire Regiment
- Driver T. Foye, 22nd Brigade Ammunition Column, Royal Field Artillery
- Corporal W. N. Frampton, Honourable Artillery Company
- Corporal W. Francis, 1st Battalion, South Wales Borderers
- Private E. Frazer, 1st Battalion, Worcestershire Regiment
- Lance-Corporal S. French, 2nd Home Counties Field Company, Royal Engineers
- Sergeant A. G. Fulton, 16th County of London Battalion, London Regiment (Queen's Westminster Rifles)
- Sergeant C. Gambling, 1st Battalion, Dorsetshire Regiment
- Private C. Gardner, 2nd Battalion, Scottish Rifles
- Company Sergeant-Major G. Garrett, 1st Battalion, Bedfordshire Regiment
- Lance-Corporal H. Gascoyne, 1st Battalion, Coldstream Guards
- Company Sergeant-Major C. Gates, 2nd Battalion, Suffolk Regiment
- Corporal H. W. Gedge, 55th Field Company, Royal Engineers
- Sergeant E. H. George, 2nd Battalion, King's Own Yorkshire Light Infantry
- Sergeant H. Gibbs, 23rd Battery, Royal Field Artillery
- Private J. Gill, 2nd Battalion, Royal Sussex Regiment
- Battery Quartermaster-Sergeant W. H. Gillard, 56th Battery, Royal Field Artillery
- Sergeant J. J. Glynn, 1st Battalion, Irish Guards
- Acting-Sergeant W. Golder, 1st Battalion, Norfolk Regiment
- Sergeant D. Gordon, 2nd Battalion, Royal Scots (Lothian Regiment)
- Lance-Corporal E. M. Gormley, 1st Battalion, Middlesex Regiment
- Lance-Corporal F. Grainge, 3rd Battalion, Coldstream Guards
- Sergeant J. Gray, 2nd Battalion, York and Lancaster Regiment
- Private W. Gray, 1st Battalion, Dorsetshire Regiment
- Sergeant E.G. Green, 1st Battalion, Norfolk Regiment
- Company Sergeant-Major L. Green, 1st Battalion, Royal Warwickshire Regiment
- Sergeant G. F. Greenhill, 4th Battalion, Royal Fusiliers
- Company Sergeant-Major F. Greenwood, 1st Battalion, Royal Fusiliers
- Company Sergeant-Major C. Gregory, 2nd Battalion, Lancashire Fusiliers
- Company Quartermaster-Sergeant A. J. Griflin, 23rd Field Company, Royal Engineers
- Private R. Griffiths, 4th Battalion, Rifle Brigade
- Sergeant P. Griggs, 1st Battalion, East Surrey Regiment
- Acting Company Sergeant-Major E. Grimes, Royal Garrison Artillery (4th Division)
- Private F. Grimwood, 1st Battalion, East Surrey Regiment
- Company Sergeant-Major T. Groggins, 2nd Battalion, Border Regiment
- Corporal J. E. Hager, 11th Battery, Royal Field Artillery
- Private A. Hainge, 1st Battalion, Royal Berkshire Regiment
- Sergeant W. Hales, 15th Field Company, Royal Engineers
- Sergeant T. Harding, 1st Battalion, Gloucestershire Regiment
- Acting Corporal W. H. Harding, 1st Battalion, East Surrey Regiment
- 1st Class Air Mechanic W. Harper, Royal Flying Corps
- Sergeant W. H. Harris, 2nd Battalion, Royal Warwickshire Regiment
- Sergeant F. Harrison, 2nd Battalion, Manchester Regiment
- Lance-Corporal D. Hart, 1st Battalion, Cameron Highlanders
- Acting Company Sergeant-Major A. Hawkins, 1st Battalion, Bedfordshire Regiment
- Bandsman J. Hay, 2nd Battalion, Seaforth Highlanders
- Acting Sergeant W. J. Hayden, 1st Battalion, Hampshire Regiment
- Private J. Hayes, 3rd Battalion, Worcestershire Regiment (transferred to Royal Engineers)
- Sergeant C. F. Hayman, 1st Battalion, Coldstream Guards
- Flight Sergeant W. C. Hayward, Royal Flying Corps
- Lance-Corporal W. Hazell, 1st London Field Company, Royal Engineers
- Private W. Hemmings, 2nd Battalion, Monmouthshire Regiment
- Piper A. Henderson, 1st Battalion, Cameron Highlanders
- Corporal T. Henson, 1st Battalion, North.amptonshire Regiment
- Private W. Herd, Royal Army Medical Corps (attached 8th Battalion, Royal Scots)
- Private J. High, 1st Battalion, Norfolk Regiment
- Private A. S. Highstone, 2nd Canadian Battalion
- Corporal J. B. Hill, 16th County of London Battalion, London Regiment (Queen's Westminster Rifles)
- Private M. Hill, Honourable Artillery Company
- Private R. Hill, 1/6th Battalion, North Staffordshire Regiment
- Sergeant W. G. Hoar, 65th Battery, Royal Field Artillery
- Lance-Corporal W. Hodgson, 2nd Battalion, Border Regiment
- Acting Sergeant J. H. Hogg, 1st Battalion, Royal Scots (Lothian Regiment)
- Private W. Hoggarth, 3rd Battalion, Coldstream Guards
- Driver A. J. Hook, British Red Cross Society (No. 4 Motor Ambulance Convoy)
- Company-Sergeant-Major C. Hopkins, 2nd Battalion, Gloucestershire Regiment
- Private J. Homer, 2nd Battalion, Yorkshire Regiment
- Sergeant W. Homer, 2nd Battalion, West Yorkshire Regiment
- Private A. Hotz, 1st Battalion, East Surrey Regiment
- Sergeant C. T. Howarth, 2nd Battalion, Nottinghamshire and Derbyshire Regiment
- Sergeant Piper J. S. Howarth, 6th (Banff and Donside) Battalion, Gordon Highlanders
- Private W. W. Howarth, 10th (Scottish) Battalion, Liverpool Regiment
- Private A. W. Howitt, Royal Army Medical Corps
- Corporal W. Huddart, 2nd Battalion, York and Lancaster Regiment
- Acting Colour-Sergeant T. Hudson, 2nd Battalion, Oxfordshire and Buckinghamshire Light Infantry
- Flight-Sergeant T. Hughes, Royal Flying Corps
- Acting Corporal T. Hughes, 2nd Battalion, Royal Welsh Fusiliers
- Gunner T. Humphrey, O Battery, Royal Horse Artillery
- Private F. N. Hunt, 2nd Battalion, Royal Welsh Fusiliers
- Acting Corporal J. Hunt, 2nd Battalion, South Staffordshire Regiment
- Private D. Hyles, 1st Battalion, King's Royal Rifle Corps
- Sergeant C. Ingram, 84th (2nd London) Field Ambulance, Royal Army Medical Corps
- Lance-Corporal J. J. Ingram, 3rd Battalion, Coldstream Guards
- Sergeant P. Ives, 3rd Canadian Battalion
- Sergeant G. W. Jackson, 1st Battalion, Coldstream Guards
- Bombardier H. James, 32nd Battery, Royal Field Artillery
- Lance-Corporal E. G. James, 1st Battalion, Royal Welsh Fusiliers
- Corporal H. Jameson, Royal Flying Corps
- Sergeant J. Jardine, 1st/1st Lowland Field Company, Royal Engineers
- Sergeant W. J. Jeffrey, 3rd Battalion, Loyal North Lancashire Regiment (attached 1st Battalion)
- Company-Sergeant-Major J. H. Johnson, 2nd Battalion, Lincolnshire Regiment
- Corporal J. Johnstone, 1st Battalion, Shropshire, Light Infantry
- Acting Corporal D. T. Jones, Honourable Artillery Company
- Bombardier A. H. Jordan, 35th Heavy Battery, Royal Garrison Artillery
- Private R. W. Joslyn, 5th Canadian Battalion
- Sapper T. Judd, 5th Signal Company, Royal Engineers
- Private A. W. Kaye, 4th Canadian Battalion
- Private R. D. Keenan, 1st Battalion, Royal Irish Fusiliers
- Sapper F. T. Keevill, 5th Signal Company, Royal Engineers
- Bandsman W. Kelly, 1st Battalion, Northumberland Fusiliers
- Corporal B. E. Kennedy, Canadian Signal Company
- Sergeant B. Kent, 2nd Battalion, West Riding Regiment
- Private T. Killen, 1st Battalion, Somerset Light Infantry
- Corporal W. J. Kimber, 2nd Battalion, Royal West Surrey Regiment
- Acting Bombardier J. D. King, 27th Brigade, Royal Field Artillery
- Acting Corporal T. C. King, 1st Battalion, Dorsetshire Regiment
- Sergeant W. Kirk, 1st Battalion, Lincolnshire Regiment
- Private J. Lambie, 1st Battalion, Argyll and Sutherland Highlanders
- Private L. Landon, 1/5th Battalion, North Staffordshire Regiment
- Private E. Langford, 1/6th Battalion, South Staffordshire Regiment
- Sergeant A. Leach, 2nd Battalion, Devonshire Regiment (attached 8th Signal Company)
- Lance-Sergeant W. Ledsham, 4th (Denbighshire) Battalion, Royal Welsh Fusiliers
- Acting Sergeant S. J. Lee, 1st Battalion, Hampshire Regiment
- Acting Bombardier E. E. Leicester, 11th Battery, Royal Field Artillery
- Company Sergeant-Major F. Lelliot, 1st Battalion, Royal Lancaster Regiment
- Company Sergeant-Major J. Lemon, 2nd Battalion, Manchester Regiment
- Acting Sergeant H. M. Lever, 2nd Battalion, Royal Scots (Lothian Regiment)
- Lance-Corporal R. Lewis, 1st Battalion, South Wales Borderers
- Acting Corporal D. Liddle, 2nd Battalion, Cameron Highlanders
- Sergeant H. Liddle, 2nd Battalion, Yorkshire Regiment
- Sergeant R. Lishman, 4th Battalion, Rifle Brigade
- Private J. Little, 1st Battalion, Cameron Highlanders
- Drill-Sergeant J. Littler, 2nd Battalion, Grenadier Guards
- Sergeant C. H. Llewellin, Air Line Section, Royal Engineers
- Gunner A. J. Lock, 1st Brigade, Royal Field Artillery
- Lance-Corporal T. Lockwood, 2nd Battalion, King's Own Yorkshire Light Infantfry
- Acting Sergeant C. Love, 2nd Battalion, Monmouthshire Regiment
- Sergeant N. M. Lowe, lst/14th County of London Battalion, London Regiment (London Scottish)
- Lance-Corporal S. Lucy, 1st Battalion, East Kent Regiment
- Private E. Luddington, 2nd Battalion, Northamptonshire Regiment (attached 8th Signal Company)
- Private R. Ludgate, South Irish Horse
- Bombardier F. C. Luke, 37th Battery, Royal Field Alrtillery
- Sergeant C. Lurin, 16th Canadian Battalion
- Private A. MacArtair, Canadian Signal Company
- Sergeant A. W. MacDonald, 1st Battalion, East Lancashire Regiment
- Sergeant J. Macdonald, Canadian Divisional Train
- Lance-Corporal J. D. Mackenzie, 2nd Battalion, Cameron Highlanders
- Private L. Macnamara, 2nd Battalion, Royal Scots Fusiliers
- Lance-Sergeant C. C. MacWalteir, 1st Battalion, East Kent Regiment
- Private J. R. Mallette, 14th Canadian Battalion
- Private W. H. Mander, 1st Battalion, North Staffordshire Regiment
- Corporal E. Mann, 1st Battalion, Royal Lancaster Regiment
- Sergeant T. Mansell, 5th Signal Company, Royal Engineers
- Private A. Mardell, 1st Battalion, Scottish Rifles
- Acting Sergeant W. Markham, 1st Battalion, Royal West Kent Regiment
- Company Sergeant-Major J. Marnie, 1/5th (Angus and Dundee) Battalion, Royal Highlanders
- Sergeant F. W. Marsh, 1st Battalion, Loyal North Lancashire Regiment
- Sergeant G. H. Marshall, 9th Field Company, Royal Engineers
- Acting Company Quartermaster-Sergeant S. Mart, 2nd Battalion, Bedfordshire Regiment
- Corporal A. Martin, 1st Battalion, Scots Guards
- Private C. Martin, 7th Battalion, Northumberland Fusiliers
- Company Sergeant-Major E. Martin, 2nd Battalion, Lancashire Fusiliers
- Bombardier F. J. Martin, 29th Brigade, Royal Field Artillery
- Lance-Corporal F. S. Martin, 1st Battalion, East Surrey Regiment
- Corporal G. Martin, 2nd Battalion, Durham Light Infantry
- Driver R. E. Mason, 4th Reserve Brigade (formerly 146th Battery), Royal Field Artillery
- Bombardier H. F. Mayo, 365th Battery, Royal Field Artillery
- Company Sergeant A. Mayston, 2nd Battalion, Worcestershire Regiment
- Company Sergeant-Major G. McCallum, 2nd Battalion, Cameron Highlanders
- Sapper M. McClosky, 56th Company, Royal Engineers
- Private P. McCormick, 2nd Battalion, Royal Irish Fusiliers
- Sergeant T. McFarland, 2nd Battalion, Royal Inniskilling Fusiliers
- Private W. McFarlane, 2nd Battalion, Royal Scots (Lothian Regiment)
- Sergeant P. McGowan, 34th Battery, Royal Field Artillery
- Sergeant J. McGuire, 1/5th Battalion, Liverpool Regiment
- Private T. McGuire, 2nd Canadian Battalion
- Private J. Mclnroy, 1st Battalion, Royal Highlanders
- Private J. McKenna, 1st Battalion, Royal Irish Fusiliers
- Sapper J. McLaren, 57th Company, Royal Engineers
- Private J. P. McManus, 2nd Battalion, King's Own Scottish Borderers
- Private J. McNeill, 8th Battalion, Royal Scots (Lothian Regiment)
- Sergeant V. J. McOmie, 105th Battery, Royal Field Artillery
- Sapper S. W. Mepham, 57th Company, Royal Engineers
- Sergeant S. H. Middleton, 2nd Battalion, Shropshire Light Infantry
- Corporal J. W. Mildenhall, 36th Brigade, Royal Field Artillery
- Private C. Miles, 1st Battalion, King's Royal Rifle Corps
- Sergeant G. Millington, 40th Battery, Royal Field Artillery
- Second Corporal C. H. Milne, 23rd Field Company, Royal Engineers
- Private C. W. Mills, 2nd Battalion, Royal West Surrey Regiment
- Sergeant E. E. Mills, 15th Field Company, Royal Engineers
- Corporal J. Minnery, 2nd Battalion, Argyll and Sutherland Highlanders
- Battery Quartermaster-Sergeant G. Mitchell, 32nd Brigade, Royal Field Artillery
- Sergeant J. Moffat, 9th (Glasgow Highland) Battalion, Highland Light Infantry
- Sergeant F. T. Montgomery, 1st Battalion, Royal Warwickshire Regiment
- Driver J. O. Moran, Army Service Corps
- Lance-Sergeant B. Morgan, 5th Battalion, Scottish Rifles
- Sergeant J. Morley, 5th Battalion, Loyal North Lancashire Regiment
- Private J. Morrison, 8th Battalion, Durham Light Infantry
- Private J. Mullins, 1st Battalion, Dorsetshire Regiment
- Private T. M. Mullins, 7th Canadian Battalion
- Private N. Mumby, 1st Battalion, Lincolnshire Regiment
- Lance-Sergeant J. Murphy, 4th Battalion, Middlesex Regiment
- Private M. Murphy, 1st Battalion, Leinster Regiment
- Sergeant S. Murray, 1st Battalion, Rifle Brigade
- Sergeant E. Murrell, 2nd Battalion, Grenadier Guards
- Corporal J. Mutimer, 24th Heavy Battery, Royal Garrison Artillery
- Lance-Corporal H. Neal, 1st Battalion, Nottinghamshire and Derbyshire Regiment
- Private J. Needham, 1st Battalion, Cheshire Regiment
- Sergeant G. Neiderauer, 3rd Battalion, Royal Sussex Regiment (attached 2nd Battalion)
- Private J. Nelson, 2nd Battalion, Cameron Highlanders
- Sergeant F. Newman, Royal Army Medical Corps
- 1st Class Air Mechanic L. S. Newns, Royal Flying Corps
- Corporal J. L. Noble, 2nd Battalion, Shropshire Light Infantry
- Private J. O'Connor, 1st Battalion, Irish Guards
- Bombardier T. O'Shaughnessey, 2nd Mountain Battery, Royal Garrison Artillery
- Lance-Cbrporal M. O'Sullivan, 2nd Battalion, Leinster Regiment
- Sergeant D. P. O'Toole, 1st Battalion, South Wales Borderers
- Company Sergeant-Major E. Owens, 1st Battalion, Cheshire Regiment
- Acting Sergeant W. E. Packhard, 1st Battalion, East Surrey Regiment
- Acting Sergeant F. E. Parker, 2nd Battalion, Royal Berkshire Regiment
- 2nd Corporal F. H. Parker, 7th Field Company, Royal Engineers
- Driver S. A. Pate, Canadian Divisional Train
- Company Sergeant-Major J. Pattison, 1/5th (Angus and Dundee) Battalion, Royal Highlanders
- Corporal E. Paul, 2nd Battalion, Nottinghamshire and Derbyshire Regiment
- Acting Corporal J. J. Pavitt, 1st Battalion, Leinsber Regiment
- Corporal R. E. P. Paynter, Royal Flying Corps
- Sergeant G. Pearce, 4th Battalion, Rifle Brigade
- Sergeant H. N. Pearless, 7th Canadian Battalion
- Acting Sergeant T. R. Pearson, 1st Battalion, Northamptonshire Regiment
- Private C. Penwill, 1st Battalion, Coldstream Guards
- Private W. Peverley, 2nd Battalion, Durham Light Infantry
- Sergeant E. J. Phillips, 26th Field Company, Royal Engineers
- Lance-Corporal C. Phillipson, 2nd Battalion, Northamptonshire Regiment
- Company Sergeant-Major A. Phipps, Army Service Corps
- Second Corporal W. A. Pirn, 43rd Wessex Divisional Signal Company, Royal Engineers
- Private L. Pollitt, 1/5th (Earl of Chester's) Battalion, Cheshire Regiment
- Company Sergeant-Major E. G. Port, 2nd Battalion, East Kent Regiment
- Sergeant W. F. Pothecary, 5th City of London Battalion, London Regiment (London Rifle Brigade)
- Company Sergeant-Major H. Potter, 1st Divisional Cyclist Company, Army Cyclist Corps (late Royal West Surrey Regiment)
- Private Jack Auguste Pouchot, 16th County of London Battalion, London Regiment (Queen's Westminster Rifles)
- Gunner G. Powley, 26th Heavy Battery, Royal Garrison Artillery
- Company Sergeant-Major (now Lieutenant) C. B. Price, 14th Canadian Battalion
- Private R. L. Prince, 1st Battalion, Somerset Light Infantry
- Sergeant G. Prior, 26th Heavy Battery, Royal Garrison Artillery
- Sergeant H. Quantrill, 1st Battalion, Suffolk Regiment
- Private H. S. Quigley, 2nd Infantry Brigade, Staff, Canadian Contingent
- Gunner J. Rafferty, Motor Machine Gun Service
- Sergeant G. H. Rastall, 1st Battalion, Royal Lancaster Regiment
- Private J. Rawlinson, 1st Battalion, Royal Lancaster Regiment
- Sergeant F. Rayment, 1st Battalion, Hertfordshire Regiment
- Gunner J. E. Reece, 33rd Brigade, Royal Field Artillery
- Sergeant H. Rees, 1st Battalion, Royal Irish Rifles
- Lance-Corporal L. H. Reeve, 1st Battalion, King's Royal Rifle Corps
- Bandsman G. P. W. Regan, 2nd Battalion, Leinster Regiment
- Acting Corporal J. Reid, 1st Battalion, Cameron Highlanders
- Lance-Corporal J. Rendall, 2nd Battalion, Welsh Regiment (attached 170th Company Royal Engineers)
- Corporal E. G. Revell, 2nd Signal Company, Royal Engineers
- Corporal S. G. Rickard, C Air Line Section, Royal Engineers
- Private F. Riddlestone, lit Battalion, Suffolk Regiment
- Sergeant-Major D. A. Rigby, 5th Battalion, Scottish Rifles
- Company Sergeant-Major F. Robb, 1st Battalion, Argyll and Sutherland Highlanders
- Lance-Corporal- A. C. G. Roberts, 2nd Battalion, Middlesex Regiment
- Gunner A. J. Roberts, 1st Siege Battery, Royal Garrison Artillery
- Private J. Roberts, 5th Battalion, South Lancashire Regiment
- Sergeant H. R. Robertson, 1/5th Battalion, Liverpool Regiment
- Lance-Corporal R. Robertson, 2nd Battalion, Highland Light Infantry
- Corporal E. D. J. Rogers, 5th Field Company, Royal Engineers
- Corporal T. O. Ross, 10th Canadian Battalion
- Corporal W. J. Rouse, 12th Field Company, Royal Engineers
- Lance-Corporal W. F. Rumfitt, 2nd Battalion, Cameron Highlanders
- Sergeant H. Russell, 7th Field Company, Royal Engineers
- Lance-Sergeant P. Rutherford, 1st Battalion, Royal Highlanders
- Private E. Salisbury, 2nd Battalion, Royal Welsh Fusiliers
- Acting Sergeant. Sawyer, 2nd Battalion, West Yorkshire Regiment
- Company Sergeant-Major M. Sayers, 1st Battalion, East Lancashire Regiment
- Corporal J. Scales, 30th Brigade, Royal Field Artillery
- Sergeant E. R. C. Scholefield (now Second Lieutenant in Special Reserve of Officers), Royal Flying Corps
- Corporal S. Schultz, 10th Canadian Battalion
- Company Sergeant-Major T. H. Scott, 2nd Battalion, Welsh Regiment
- Company Sergeant-Major A. Scrase, 1st Battalion, Rifle Brigade
- Acting Corporal A. W. Sear, 1st Battalion, Royal Berkshire Regiment
- Private J. H. Searle, 1st Battalion, Devonshire Regiment
- Sergeant E. Selby, 1st Battalion, Hertfordshire Regiment
- Corporal J. A. Selwood, 1/4th (City of Bristol) Battalion, Gloucestershire Regiment
- Private J. E. Shalliker, 2nd Battalion, Manchester Regiment
- Corporal J. Shanks, 9th (Dumbartonshire) Battalion, Argyll and Sutherland Highlanders
- Company Sergeant-Major (now Second Lieutenant) W. Sheay, 2nd Battalion, Yorkshire Regiment
- Private B. R. Sheil, 1/8th Battalion, Royal Warwickshire Regiment
- Lance-Corporal J. Sinclair, 1st Battalion, Argyll and Sutherland Highlanders
- Corporal S. P. Skinner, 56th Company, Royal Engineers
- Company Sergeant-Major T. F. Slim, 3rd Battalion, Worcestershire Regiment
- Sergeant J. Slorance, 1st Battalion, Royal Highlanders
- Private C. F. Smith, 1st Battalion, Lincolnshire Regiment
- Corporal E. Smith, 1st Battalion, King's Own Yorkshire Light Infantry
- Sapper G. Smith, 15th Field Company, Royal Engineers
- Acting Corporal H. Smith, 6th Battalion, Northumberland Fusiliers
- Private H. Smith, 2nd Battalion, Royal West Surrey Regiment
- Battery Sergeant-Major J. Smith, 43rd Battery, Royal Field Artillery
- Private J. Smith. 2nd Battalion. Gordon Highlanders
- Private J. W. Smith, 1st Battalion, East Yorkshire Regiment
- Sergeant V. R. Smith, 2nd Battalion, East Kent Regiment
- Sergeant W. Smith, 1st Battalion, Gloucestershire Regiment. R
- Lance-Corporal T. H. Spanton, 3rd Battalion, King's Royal Rifle Corps
- Bombardier A. Spence, Royal Field Artillery
- Lance-Corporal J. Stead, 2nd Battalion, Scots Guards
- Lance-Corporal R. Stead, 1st Battalion, West Yorkshire Regiment
- Lance-Corporal A. E. Stevens, 2nd Battalion, Gloucestershire Regiment
- Lance-Corporal D. A. Stewart, 1st/14th County of London Battalion, London Regiment (London Scottish)
- Company Sergeant-Major J. J. .Stewart, 2nd Battalion, King's Own Scottish Borderers
- Acting Sergeant R. Stewart, 2nd Battalion, Gordon Highlanders
- Drummer A. J. Stiffin, Honourable Artillery Company
- Private A. P. Stokes, 5th Battalion, Northumberland Fusiliers
- Private A. Storer, 1/6th. Battalion, North Staffordshire Regiment
- Corporal J. S. Stott, 1st/14th County of London Battalion, London Regiment (London Scottish)
- Lance-Corporal T. H. Stranson, 5th City of London Battalion, London Regiment (London Rifle Brigade)
- Private C. J. Sturch, 2nd Battalion, Rifle Brigade
- Regimental Sergeant-Major A. Sutherland, 1st Battalion, Seaforth Highlanders
- Sergeant W. Swain, 2nd Field Company, Royal Engineers
- Acting Company Sergeant-Major E. Tabb, 1st Battalion, Devonshire Regiment
- Lance-Corporal W. G. Tanner, 2nd Battalion, Argyll and Sutherland Highlanders
- Gunner R. Taylor, 104th Battery, Royal Field Artillery
- Sergeant W. Tector, let Battalion, Leinster Regiment
- Sergeant A. Thompson, 1st Battalion, Northumberland Fusiliers
- Private F. Thompson, 1st Battalion, Cheshire Regiment
- Acting Corporal J. Thompson, 2nd Battalion, King's Own Scottish Borderers
- Private T. Thorburn, 2nd Battalion, Argyll and Sutherland Highlanders
- Corporal G. Tibbets, 2nd Battalion, Worcestershire Regiment
- Company Sergeant-Major J. P. Tighe, 1st Battalion, Royal Irish Regiment
- Flight-Sergeant T. G. Tindale, Royal Flying Corps
- Private W. J. Tookey, 1st Battalion, King's Own Yorkshire Light Infantry
- Sergeant H. Trasler, 1st Battalion, Bedfordshire Regiment
- Acting Company Quartermaster-Sergeant G. F. Turl, 2nd Battalion, Essex Regiment
- Private J. Turnbull, 9th (Dumbartonshire) Battalion, Argyll and Sutherland Highlanders
- Private F. Turner, Canadian Army Medical Corps
- Sergeant C. Utting, 2nd Field Company, Royal Engineers
- Corporal A. S. Vallis, 2nd Battalion, Royal Scots Fusiliers
- Sergeant H. Venn, 2nd Battalion, Royal Berkshire Regiment
- Corporal B. Venters, 364th Battery, Royal Field Artillery
- Sergeant H. J. V. Voisey, Royal Army Medical Corps
- Private O. Waghorn, 5th (Cinque Ports) Battalion, Royal Sussex Regiment
- Lance-Corporal F. B. Wakelin, 1st Canadian Battalion
- Acting Corporal T. Wallace, 1st Battalion, Royal Soots (Lothian Regiment)
- Private H. Walters, 8th Canadian Battalion
- Acting Sergeant E. Ward, 1st Battalion, Royal Berkshire Regiment
- Lance-Corporal C. Warner, 1st Battalion, Nottinghamshire and Derbyshire Regiment
- Corporal A. Watson, 72nd Battery, Royal Field Artillery
- Lance-Corporal H. Watson, 2nd Battalion, East Lancashire Regiment
- Private W. R. Watt, 6th (Banff and Donside) Battalion, Gordon Highlanders
- Lance-Corporal H. Watts, 1st Battalion, Royal Lancaster Regiment
- Company Sergeant-Major H. Webb, 1st Battalion, Worcestershire Regiment
- Company Sergeant-Major W. Webb, 2nd Battalion, Suffolk Regiment
- Sergeant W. J. Webb, 119th Heavy Battery, Royal Garrison Artillery
- Sergeant J. Webster, 1/5th (Angus and Dundee) Battalion, Royal Highlanders
- Company Sergeant-Major W. Weeks, 1st Battalion, Welsh Regiment
- Sergeant J. Wells, 2nd Battalion, Worcestershire Regiment
- Private A. J. West, 1st Battalion, Middlesex Regiment
- Company Sergeant-Major W. F. Westcott, 2nd Battalion, West Yorkshire Regiment
- Private A. T. Weston, 1/6th Battalion, North Staffordshire Regiment
- Lance-Corporal H. P. Wheeldon, 1/8th Battalion, Royal Warwickshire Regiment
- Private G. A. White, 5th Canadian Battalion
- Bombardier J. G. E. P. Whiting, 8th Brigade, Royal Field Artillery
- Lance-Corporal W. G. Whiting, 2nd Battalion, Yorkshire Regiment
- Lance-Corporal W. Whitla, 1st Canadian Battalion
- Corporal J. J. Wibberly, 55th Field Company, Royal Engineers
- Acting Sergeant H. Wicks, 1st Battalion, Leinster Regiment
- Company Quartermaster-Sergeant F. Widdowson, 1st Battalion, Nottinghamshire and Derbyshire Regiment
- Corporal T. Wilkie, 2nd Battalion, Coldstream Guards
- Private R. Wilkinson, 1st Battalion, King's Royal Rifle Corps
- Acting Lance-Corporal G. Williams, 1st Battalion, Lincolnshire Regiment
- Acting Corporal J. Williams, 2nd Battalion, Royal Welsh Fusiliers
- Private W. Williams, 2nd Battalion, Scottish Rifles
- Private R. Wilson, 1st Battalion, Royal Highlanders
- Private T. Wilson, 1st Battalion, Royal Scots (Lothian Regiment)
- Corporal W. Wilson, 1st Battalion, Leicestershire Regiment
- Acting Corporal A. Windebank, 2nd City of London Battalion, London Regiment (Royal Fusiliers)
- Company Sergeant-Major C. Withers, 1st Battalion, South Staffordshire Regiment
- Corporal J. Wood, 9th Field Company, Royal Engineers
- Sergeant J. E. Wood, 1st Battalion, East Yorkshire Regiment
- Corporal R. J. Wood, 1st Wessex Field Ambulance, Royal Army Medical Corps
- Private W. G. Woodroff, 1st Battalion, Wiltshire Regiment
- Company Sergeant-Major A. Worsley, 1st Battalion, Royal Lancaster Regiment
- Driver H. Wray, 366th Battery, Royal Field Artillery
- Acting Sergeant D. Wright, 1st Battalion, Royal West Kent Regiment
- Company Sergeant-Major H. Wright, 3rd Battalion, Middlesex Regiment
- Sergeant W. E. Wyatt, 57th Company, Royal Engineers
- Serjeant J. Yearsley, 1st Battalion, Argyll and Sutherland Highlanders
- Lance-Corporal S. Yorke, 2nd Battalion, South Lancashire Regiment
- Sapper C. Young, 2nd Field Company, Royal Engineers
- Lance-Sergeant H. Young, 2nd Battalion, King's Royal Rifle Corps
- Lance-Sergeant J. Young, 1st Battalion, Royal West Kent Regiment
- Sergeant W. Young, 2nd Battalion, Scots Guards
- Private J. Yourston, 7th Battalion, Northumberland Fusiliers

=== Indian Order of Merit (IOM) ===
"His Majesty the KING-EMPEROR has been graciously pleased to approve of the undermentioned Rewards to Officers, Non-Commissioned Officers and Men of the Indian Army for gallantry and devotion to duty whilst serving with the Indian Army Corps, British Expeditionary Force:"

2nd Class

- Sapper Jiwa Khan (No. 3 Company), 1st King George's Own Sappers and Miners
- Havildar Bishii Singh, 15th Ludhiana Sikhs
- Sepoy Bakshi Singh, 15th Ludhiana Sikhs
- Sepoy Bhagwan Singh, 36th Sikhs (attached 47th Sikhs)
- Jemadar Lehna Singh, 40th Pathans
- Jemadar Mangal Singh., 57th Wilde's Rifles (Frontier Force)
- Naik Atma Singh, 57th Wilde's Rifles (Frontier Force)
- Sepoy Raji Khan, 129th Duke of Connaught's Own Baluchis
- Rifleman Bhaudoj Rai, 1st Battalion, 4th Gurkha Rifles
- Havildar Bhakat Singh Raua, 2nd Battalion, 4th Gurkha Rifles (attached 1/1st Battalion)
- Rifleman Tika Ram Kunwar, 1st Battalion, 3rd Gurkha, Rifles

=== Indian Distinguished Service Medal (IDSM) ===
- Jemadar Nur Alam, 3rd Sappers and Miners (20th Company)
- Driver Havildar Mahamed Baksh, 3rd Sappers and Miners (21st Company)
- Sapper Indar Singh, 3rd Sappers and Miners (20th Company)
- 2nd Class Senior Sub-Assistant Surgeon Mahadeo-Pershad, Indian Subordinate Medical Department (attached II 1st Gurkha Rifles).
- 1st Class Sub-Assistant Surgeon Narayan-Parshad Sukul, Indian Subordinate Medical Department (112th Field Ambulance)
- Lance Naik Mangli, Army Bearer Corps, 8 Company, 113th Field Ambulance.

=== Royal Red Cross (RRC) ===
Queen Alexandra's Imperial Military Nursing Service

- F. M. Hodgins
- H. W. Reid
- G. M. Richards
- A. F. Byers
- J. H. Congleton
- M. C. Corbishley
- H. Hartigan
- C. MacK. MacRae
- K. M. Mathews
- G. M. Smith

Queen Alexandra's Imperial Military Nursing Service (Reserve)

- N. Adler
- E. G. Barrett
- E. M. Hansard
- C. Elston
- J. Barclay Smith
- L. M. Thurling

Queen Alexandra's Military Nursing Service for India

- E. F. Watt

Territorial Force Nursing Service

- H. G. Palin
- A. H. Ivin
- E. A. Jackson
- P. M. Morris
- C. Webber

Civil Hospitals Reserve

- I. E. M. Barbier, Royal Infirmary, Bristol
- S. C. Mclntosh, Royal Infirmary, Edinburgh
- M. Clark, Royal Southern Hospital, Liverpool
- M. A. Doherty, Dr. Steven's Hospital, Dublin
- E. T. Ferguson, Royal Infirmary, Perth
- F. Harley, St. Thomas's Hospital, London
- K. Johnston, City of Dublin Hospital, Dublin
- V. M. Kiddle, Guy's Hospital, London
- E. M. Le Sueur, University College Hospital, London
- M. Oakey, General Hospital, Birmingham
- L. O. Peet, Derby Royal Infirmary, Derby
- A. Wainwright, London Hospital, London

British Red Cross Society

- N. Fletcher

Australian Nursing Service

- Ida M. Greaves

Canadian Nursing Service

- E. Campbell
