= Vincent Alexander Ormsby =

British Indian Army officer (1865–1917)

Brigadier General Vincent Alexander Ormsby CB
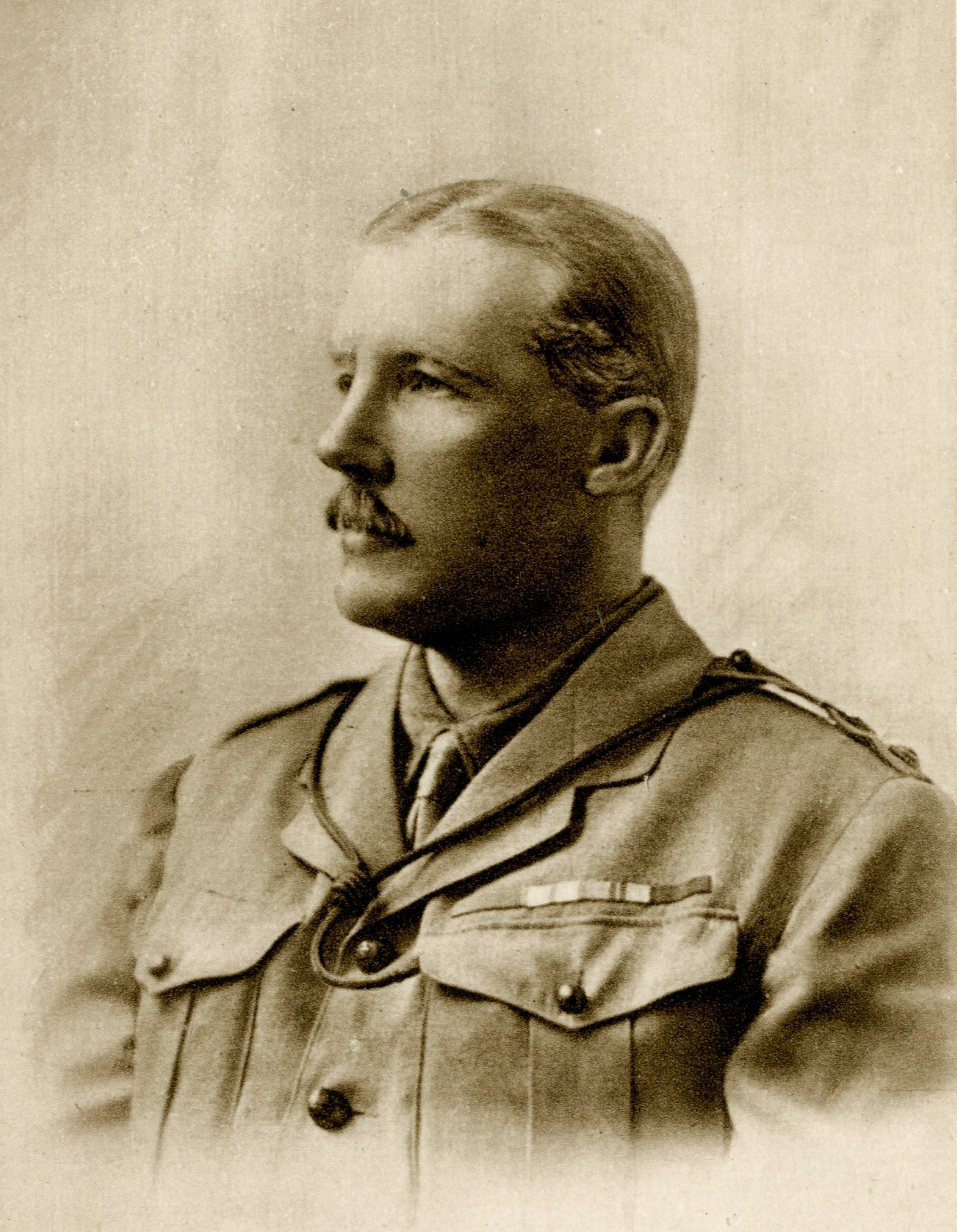
- Born: July 1865
- Died: May 1917 (aged 51); France

Brigadier General Vincent Alexander Ormsby, CB (July 1865 – May 1917) was a British Indian Army officer. He was killed in action in France in 1917, while commanding the 127th (Manchester) Brigade.

For his wartime leadership, he was appointed a Companion of the Order of the Bath (CB) in the 1915 Birthday Honours.

His military career began on 7 February 1885 when he graduated from the Royal Military College, Sandhurst, and was commissioned as a lieutenant into the East Surrey Regiment of the British Army.
