= Charles Bowle-Evans =

British Indian Army general

Major-General Charles Bowle-Evans CMG CBE
- Born: Charles Harford Bowle-Evans; 19 October 1867
- Died: 23 August 1942 (aged 74)
- Military career
- Allegiance: United Kingdom
- Branch: (British Raj) Indian Medical Service
- Rank: Major-General
- Awards: Companion of the Order of St Michael and St George; Commander of the Order of the British Empire

Major-General Charles Harford Bowle-Evans CMG CBE (19 October 1867 – 23 August 1942), born Charles Harford Evans, was an officer in the Indian Medical Service.

Bowle-Evans was the son of John Bowle-Evans. He was commissioned surgeon-lieutenant in the IMS on the Bengal Establishment in January 1894. He served in Waziristan in 1894–1895 and Chitral in 1895, was promoted surgeon-captain in January 1897, served on the North-West Frontier in 1897–1898, and in the Boxer Rebellion in China in 1900. He was promoted major in 1905 and lieutenant-colonel in 1913.

During the First World War, he served in Europe from 1914 to 1915, for which he was appointed Companion of the Order of St Michael and St George (CMG) in 1915. He served with the Bushire Field Force in Persia in 1919 as a temporary colonel, for which he was appointed Commander of the Order of the British Empire (CBE) in January 1920. He was promoted substantive colonel in 1921 and major-general in 1923, when he was appointed director of medical services to HM Forces in India. He retired in October the same year due to poor health and settled in Cheltenham, Gloucestershire.

He married Ellen Stevenson, daughter of Major-General William Flack Stevenson of the Royal Army Medical Corps, on 22 October 1902 at St Patrick's Roman Catholic Church, Woolston, Southampton.
