= List of generals of the British Empire who died during the First World War =

This list includes all officers of general rank who are listed by the Commonwealth War Graves Commission (CWGC) as having died while serving with British Empire forces during the First World War. During this period general officers were those who held the rank of field marshal, general, lieutenant-general, major-general, or brigadier-general and generally commanded units of brigade size or larger.

A popular view arose in post-war years that British general officers were detached from the fighting in châteaux far behind the front line. This view has been criticised as a misconception by some military historians. In 1995, British military historians Frank Davis and Graham Maddocks compiled, in the book Bloody Red Tabs, a list of 78 general officers that they considered to have been killed as a result of active service. This list provided below includes officers who died from all causes and so is broader than Davis and Maddocks' list. It includes 123 officers who died between the British entry into the war, 4 August 1914, and the armistice of 11 November 1918. Listed separately are 34 who died between the armistice and 31 August 1921 which was defined by an act of British parliament as the formal end of the war.

== Background ==
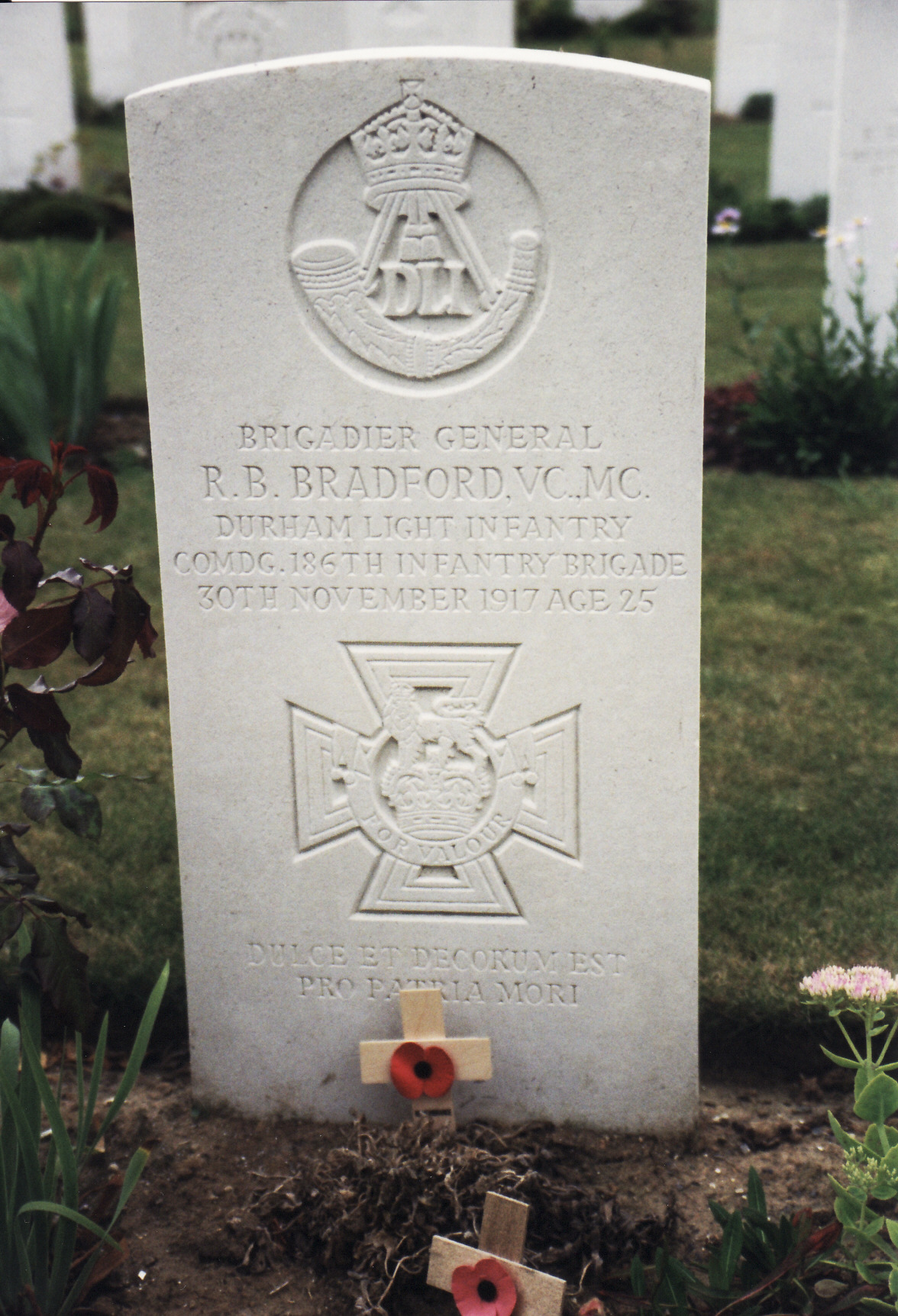
Gravestone of Brigadier-General Roland Bradford, killed 30 November 1917

General officer ranks in the armies of the British Empire of the First World War were, in descending order of seniority: field marshal, general, lieutenant-general, major-general, and brigadier-general. Field marshal was usually an honorary appointment, with the most senior active duty officers being generals. Generals typically commanded field armies, lieutenant-generals corps, major-generals divisions, and brigadier-generals brigades. Other generals served in staff roles.

At the start of the war the British Army contained 9 field marshals, 19 generals, 28 lieutenant-generals, 114 major-generals, and 180 brigadier-generals. At the end of the war in 1918, the expansion of the army had seen this rise to 8 field marshals, 29 generals, 47 lieutenant-generals, 219 major-generals, and 600 brigadier-generals.

The armies of Canada, Australia, New Zealand and South Africa, all of which were dominions of the British Empire, were generally much smaller than the British Army in 1914. The Indian Army, based in and recruiting from British-administered India, was comparable in size. All of the British Empire armies expanded greatly during the war and by 1918 some 80 British Empire divisions were in the field.

At the start of the war most of the senior commanders in the dominion armies were British officers provided on loan. The South African army was an exception, containing only five British officers in 1914 and fought throughout the war largely under command of South African officers and generals. During the war the other dominion armies introduced policies that sought to increase the number of senior commanders drawn from dominion personnel as they became more experienced, although British officers continued to serve in their armies until the end of the war. During the war senior officers of the Indian Army with full right to command were exclusively white, Indian officers were not permitted to command white troops until after the war.

== Châteaux generals view ==
There has long been a view that British generals of the First World War were isolated from their men, issuing orders from châteaux far behind the front line with little thought for the reality in the trenches. This view has been criticised by Davis and Maddocks among others. The role of the general officers was not to oversee troops directly but to maintain a headquarters from which they could receive information and direct the battle. In the early months of the war casualties among British general officers were high; indeed in a period of nine days in late September and early October 1914 eight generals were killed, wounded, or captured, a considerable loss of leadership and command experience. On 3 October 1915 following the loss of three division commanders killed in action in a week, the Chief of the Imperial General Staff Lieutenant-General William Robertson ordered corps and division commanders of the armies on the Western Front not to expose themselves to danger during battle.

One of the most prominent persons to propagate the "chateau generals" view, was wartime Prime Minister David Lloyd George in his 1933 War Memoirs. The view was advocated by Alan Clark's 1961 book The Donkeys and the 1964 BBC documentary series The Great War.

Since the 1980s military historians including Shelford Bidwell, Tim Travers, John Terraine, and Williamson Murray have stated that rather than being châteaux generals who hid in the rear, the British Army leadership of the war were creative innovators, keen to overcome the stalemate of trench warfare.

== Causes of death ==
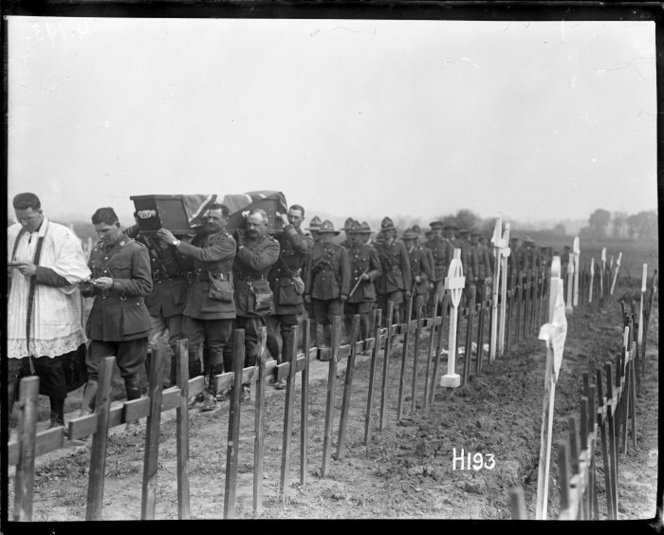
Funeral of Brigadier-General Francis Earl Johnston, 18 August 1917

Historians Frank Davis and Graham Maddocks published, in 1995, Bloody Red Tabs, that attempted to list all British Empire generals who had been killed in action, died of wounds, or died as a result of active service during the war. They found 78 general officers in these categories. Although Maddocks and Davis could not find a conclusive cause of death in some cases they assessed that 34 of the deaths were caused by artillery fire, 22 by small arms fire, three from drowning, four from accidents, and one from cholera. None of the generals were killed in their châteaux (though two were wounded non-fatally there). The proportion of deaths by shell fire is lower than that for British Army casualties as a whole and a disproportionate number of generals were killed by small arms fire, indicating a presence in the front lines. A further 146 generals were either wounded or taken prisoner during the war.

== Comparisons ==
British historians of economics Roy Bailey and Timothy Hatton and Canadian health historian Kris Inwood in a 2003 study found that of all those that served in the British Army during the war around 11% died. They found that the average rate of death for officers was higher than for those serving in other positions throughout the war: officers were 1.85 times more likely to die than other ranks. Taking those that joined the British Army in 1914, 74% of officers and 85% of other ranks survived to the end of the conflict in 1918.

French Marshal Ferdinand Foch listed 41 of his generals killed in action during the war, whose names were engraved on a memorial at Les Invalides. A wider listing of all those mort pour la France by Gerard Gehin for Le Souvenir français gives 81 generals. French historian Laurent Guillemot working from a definition similar to Foch gives numbers of 76 British, 42 French, 2 Belgian, 2 Italian, and 2 Romanian generals killed on the Allied side and around 70 German, 40 Austro-Hungarian, and 1 Ottoman on the Central Powers side. The American Battle Monuments Commission records three generals (all brigadier generals) in its listing of First World War deaths; one died during the war in 1918, one in 1919 and one in 1923.

== Inclusion criteria ==
The Commonwealth War Graves Commission was formed during the war as the Imperial War Graves Commission to maintain records and graves of all known war dead from the Imperial armed forces. Their records list all those known to have "died while serving in the Commonwealth forces during the war" while on "active service" from any cause. They also list those who died after discharge from the armed forces where that death was a result of wounds, accident or disease contracted on active service or from a disease that was aggravated by active service. Their definition of "active service" includes all officers in full-time service in the armed forces and those in part-time service if they were on active duty at the time of their death. Their records include other general officers not listed by Davis and Maddocks.

Table key
†	Indicates the officer is listed in Bloody Red Tabs

== Pre-armistice deaths ==
=== Field Marshals ===
Image	Name	Branch	Command	Date of death	Place of death	Cause of death	Ref.
	Lord Roberts	British Army	Colonel-in-Chief of Overseas and Indian Forces in the United Kingdom	14 November 1914	Saint-Omer, France	Illness	
	Sir Charles Henry Brownlow	Indian Army		5 April 1916	Bracknell, United Kingdom	Illness	
	Lord Kitchener†	British Army	Secretary of State for War	5 June 1916	Off Mainland, Orkney, Atlantic Ocean	Killed in action	

=== Generals ===
Image	Name	Branch	Command	Date of death	Place of death	Cause of death	Ref.
	Sir Charles Douglas	British Army	Chief of the Imperial General Staff	25 October 1914	London, United Kingdom	Illness	

=== Lieutenant-Generals ===
Image	Name	Branch	Command	Date of death	Place of death	Cause of death	Ref.
	Sir James Grierson	British Army	II Corps	17 August 1914	Near Amiens, France	Illness	
	Sir William Franklyn	British Army	Third Army	27 October 1914	London, United Kingdom	Illness	
	Samuel Lomax†	British Army	1st Division	10 April 1915	London, United Kingdom	Wounds received	
	Robert Broadwood†	British Army	57th (2nd West Lancashire) Division	21 June 1917	Estaires, France	Wounds received	
	Sir Pardey Lukis	Indian Army	Indian Medical Service	21 October 1917	Simla, India	Illness	
	Sir Stanley Maude†	British Army	Mesopotamian Expeditionary Force	18 November 1917	Baghdad, Mesopotamia	Illness	

=== Major-Generals ===
Image	Name	Branch	Command	Date of death	Place of death	Cause of death	Ref.
	Hubert Hamilton†	British Army	3rd Division	14 October 1914	La Couture, France	Killed in action	
	Robert Kekewich	British Army	13th (Western) Division	5 November 1914	Whimple, United Kingdom	Suicide	
	Henry Heath	British Army	South Midland Division	29 July 1915	London, United Kingdom	Illness	
	Sir William Bridges†	Australian Army	1st Division	18 May 1915	HMHS Gascon, Mediterranean Sea	Wounds received	
	Ralph Champney Broome	Indian Army	Indian Army Remount Department	26 August 1915	Colombo, Ceylon	Illness	
	Archibald Playfair	Indian Army	Bengal Staff Corps	10 September 1915	St Leonards-on-Sea, United Kingdom		
	Sir Thompson Capper†	British Army	7th Division	27 September 1915	Loos, France	Wounds received	
	George Thesiger†	British Army	9th (Scottish) Division	27 September 1915	Auchy-les-Mines, France	Killed in action	
	Frederick Wing†	British Army	12th (Eastern) Division	2 October 1915	Mazingarbe, France	Killed in action	
	Malcolm Mercer†	Canadian Expeditionary Force	3rd Canadian Division	3 June 1916	Mount Sorrel, Belgium	Killed in action	
	Edward Ingouville-Williams†	British Army	34th Division	22 July 1916	Mametz, France	Killed in action	
	Sir Frederick Benson	Reserve of Officers	British Remount Commission in North America	20 August 1916	Montreal, Canada	Illness	
	Edmund Davidson Smith	British Army	Assistant Quartermaster General, Dublin District	8 September 1916	Hove, United Kingdom		
	William Holmes†	Australian Army	4th Division	2 July 1917	Messines, Belgium	Wounds received	
	Edward Feetham†	British Army	39th Division	29 March 1918	Ignaucourt, France	Killed in action	
	Richard Hutton Davies	British Army	In hospital, former commander 20th (Light) Division	9 May 1918	London, United Kingdom	Suicide	
	William George Birrell	British Army	Retired due to ill health contracted on service, formerly Deputy Director Medical Services of Southern Command	23 August 1918	Lochboisdale, United Kingdom	Illness	
	Louis Lipsett†	Canadian Expeditionary Force	4th Division	14 October 1918	Haspres, France	Killed in action	

=== Brigadier-Generals ===
Image	Name	Branch	Command	Date of death	Place of death	Cause of death	Ref.
	Neil Douglas Findlay†	British Army	Royal Artillery, 1st Division	10 September 1914	Priez, France	Killed in action	
	Norman McMahon†	British Army	4th Battalion, Royal Fusiliers (Note: Awaiting a staff appointment at the time of his death.)	11 November 1914	Hooge, Belgium	Killed in action	
	Charles Fitzclarence†	British Army	1st (Guards) Brigade	12 November 1914	Polygon Wood, Belgium	Killed in action	
	William Murray	British Army	Retired due to ill-health, formerly commander Pretoria District	2 February 1915			
	Richard Kelly	British Army	Royal Artillery, Southern Coast Defences	20 February 1915	Portsmouth, United Kingdom		
	John Gough†	British Army	10th Brigade	22 February 1915	Estaires, France	Wounds received	
	Henry Napier†	British Army	88th Brigade	25 April 1915	Sedd el Bahr, Ottoman Empire	Killed in action	
	James Foster Riddell†	British Army	149th (Northumberland) Brigade	26 April 1915	Sint-Juliaan, Belgium	Killed in action	
	Julian Hasler†	British Army	11th Brigade	27 April 1915	Ypres, Belgium	Killed in action	
	Henry Normand MacLaurin	Australian Army	1st Brigade (Note: As a colonel, posthumously promoted to brigadier-general.)	27 April 1915	ANZAC Cove, Ottoman Empire	Killed in action	
	Arthur Lowry Cole†	British Army	25th Brigade	9 May 1915	Aubers, France	Wounds received	
	George Colborne Nugent†	British Army	141st (5th London) Brigade	31 May 1915	Béthune, France	Killed in action	
	Mainwaring Jacson	British Army	Reserve Infantry Brigade, Portsmouth Garrison	2 June 1915	Portsmouth, United Kingdom		
	Noel Lee†	British Army	127th (Manchester) Brigade	22 June 1915	Malta	Wounds received	
	William Scott-Moncrieff†	British Army	156th (Scottish Rifles) Brigade	28 June 1915	Gallipoli, Ottoman Empire	Killed in action	
	Anthony Baldwin†	British Army	38th Brigade	10 August 1915	Chunuk Bair, Ottoman Empire	Killed in action	
	Lord Longford†	British Army	2nd Mounted Brigade	21 August 1915	Scimitar Hill, Ottoman Empire	Killed in action	
	Paul Aloysius Kenna†	British Army	3rd Mounted Brigade	30 August 1915	Suvla Bay, Ottoman Empire	Wounds received	
	Norman Nickalls†	British Army	63rd Brigade	26 September 1915	Loos-en-Gohelle, France	Killed in action	
	Frank Wormald†	British Army	5th Cavalry Brigade	3 October 1915	Vermelles, France	Killed in action	
	John Hepburn-Stuart-Forbes-Trefusis†	British Army	20th Brigade	24 October 1915	Givenchy-lès-la-Bassée, France	Killed in action	
	Hugh Fitton†	British Army	101st Brigade	20 January 1916	Ypres, Belgium	Wounds received	
	George Hodson†	Indian Army	33rd Indian Brigade	25 January 1916	Tigne Hospital, Malta	Wounds received	
	William Harvey†	British Army	19th (Dehra Dun) Brigade	1 February 1916	Hana, Mesopotamia	Wounds received	
	Thomas Wight-Boycott	British Army	2nd South Midland Mounted Brigade	30 March 1916	London, United Kingdom	Illness	
	Frederick Hoghton†	Indian Army	17th Brigade	12 April 1916	Kut, Ottoman Empire	Illness	
	Augustus McKerrell	British Army	Tay Defence Garrison	24 April 1916	Dundee, United Kingdom		
	Richard Menteith Greenfield	British Army	On the headquarters staff of Irish Command	25 April 1916	Croxley Green, United Kingdom		
	Gerard Rice	Indian Army	35th Indian Brigade	7 May 1916	Mesopotamia		
	Frederick Heyworth†	British Army	3rd Guards Brigade	9 May 1916	Ypres, Belgium	Killed in action	
	Henry Buchanan Kirk	British Army	93rd Brigade	12 May 1916	Le Tréport, France	Illness	
	Colquhoun Grant Morrison	British Army	President of Claims Commission	23 May 1916	Amiens, France	Accident	
	Sir Hay Donaldson	British Army	Chief Superintendent, Ordnance Factories	5 June 1916	Off Mainland, Orkney, Atlantic Ocean	Killed in action	
	Wilfred Ellershaw†	British Army	Special Service Officer, War Office	5 June 1916	Off Mainland, Orkney, Atlantic Ocean	Killed in action	
	Hubert Du Cane	British Army	General Staff	15 June 1916	Wickham Market, United Kingdom	Illness	
	Charles Bertie Prowse†	British Army	11th Brigade	1 July 1916	Beaumont-Hamel, France	Wounds received	
	Edwin Hazelton	Indian Army	Indian Veterinary Corps	24 July 1916	Simla, India	Illness	
	Archie Stewart Buckle	British Army	Royal Artillery, 17th (Northern) Division	18 August 1916	Near the Somme, France	Illness	
	Louis Murray Phillpotts†	British Army	Royal Artillery, 24th Division	8 September 1916	Guillemont, France	Killed in action	
	Henry Clifford†	British Army	149th (Northumberland) Brigade	11 September 1916	High Wood, France	Killed in action	
	Charles Stewart†	British Army	154th Brigade	14 September 1916	Houplines, France	Killed in action	
	Philip Howell†	British Army	General Staff Officer, II Corps	7 October 1916	Authuille, France	Killed in action	
	Duncan Glasfurd†	British Army	12th Brigade	12 November 1916	Heilly, France	Wounds received	
	George Bull†	British Army	8th Brigade	11 December 1916	Varennes, France	Wounds received	
	Robert Henry William Dunn	British Army	Until 8 December 1916 commanded a reserve brigade	8 January 1917	Cheshire, United Kingdom	Injuries sustained in an accident	
	Lord Binning	British Army	President of the Territorial Force Association	12 January 1917	Prestonkirk, United Kingdom	Illness	
	Walter Long†	British Army	56th Brigade	28 January 1917	Couin, France	Killed in action	
	Francis de Gex	British Army	Base Commandant, Rouen	2 April 1917	Rouen, France	Illness	
	Charles Bulkeley-Johnson†	British Army	8th Cavalry Brigade	11 April 1917	Monchy-le-Preux, France	Killed in action	
	Charles Gosling†	British Army	10th Brigade	12 April 1917	Arras, France	Killed in action	
	Godfrey Estcourt Matthews†	Royal Marines (seconded to the British Army)	198th (East Lancashire) Brigade	13 April 1917	Cambrin, France	Killed in action	
	Vincent Ormsby†	Indian Army	127th (Manchester) Brigade	2 May 1917	Ronssoy, France	Killed in action	
	Arthur Roberts	British Army	80th Brigade	17 May 1917	London, United Kingdom	Operation	
	Lewin Walton	Indian Army		24 May 1917	Simla, India		
	Charles Henry Brown†	New Zealand Military Forces	1st Brigade	8 June 1917	Messines, Belgium	Killed in action	
	Gerald Holland	British Army	Assistant director of Inland Water Transport, France	26 June 1917	Hastings, United Kingdom	Illness	
	Charles Gordon†	British Army	123rd Brigade	23 July 1917	Heuvelland, Belgium	Killed in action	
	John Tanner†	British Army	Royal Engineers, VII Corps	23 July 1917	Wancourt, France	Killed in action	
	Alister Gordon†	British Army	153rd Brigade	31 July 1917	Ypres, Belgium	Wounds received	
	Francis Earl Johnston†	New Zealand Military Forces	New Zealand Rifle Brigade	7 August 1917	Ploegsteert Wood, Belgium	Killed in action	
	Ronald Maclachlan†	British Army	112th Brigade	11 August 1917	Oostaverne, Belgium	Killed in action	
	Malcolm Peake†	British Army	Royal Artillery, I Corps	27 August 1917	Loos, France	Killed in action	
	Francis Aylmer Maxwell†	British Army	27th Brigade	21 September 1917	Zonnebeke, Belgium	Killed in action	
	Cecil Rawling†	British Army	62nd Brigade	28 October 1917	Hooge, Belgium	Killed in action	
	Orlando Gunning	Indian Army	36th Indian Brigade	14 November 1917	Wynberg, Cape Town, South Africa	Wounds received	
	Edward Stokes-Roberts	British Army	Director of Works, Mesopotamian Expeditionary Force	22 November 1917	Baghdad, Mesopotamia	Illness	
	Arthur Lowe†	British Army	Royal Artillery, 66th Division	24 November 1917	Ypres, Belgium	Killed in action	
	Roland Bradford†	British Army	186th (2/2nd West Riding) Brigade	30 November 1917	Graincourt-lès-Havrincourt, France	Killed in action	
	Arthur Howell	British Army	1st London Reserve Brigade	15 January 1918	Blackdown Camp, near Camberley, United Kingdom		
	Gordon Strachey Shephard†	British Army	I Brigade, Royal Flying Corps	19 January 1918	Auchel, France	Accident	
	Sir Samuel Pethebridge	Australian Army	Administrator of Allied-occupied German New Guinea	25 January 1918	Canterbury, New South Wales, Australia	Illness	
	George Cape†	British Army	39th Division	18 March 1918	Ronssoy, France	Killed in action	
	Randle Barnett Barker†	British Army	99th Brigade	24 March 1918	Gueudecourt, France	Killed in action	
	Harry Fulton†	New Zealand Military Forces	New Zealand Rifle Brigade	29 March 1918	Colincamps, France	Wounds received	
	Charles Campbell	British Army	5th Cavalry Brigade	31 March 1918	London, United Kingdom		
	George Forster†	British Army	42nd Brigade	4 April 1918	Aubigny, France	Killed in action	
	Robert Gore†	British Army	101st Brigade	13 April 1918	Mont de Lille, Belgium	Killed in action	
	Charles Richard Townley	British Army		15 May 1918	Boscombe, United Kingdom		
	Duncan Sayre MacInnes†	British Army	Inspector of Mines, GHQ	23 May 1918	Étaples, France	Accident	
	Cuthbert Martin†	British Army	151st Brigade	27 May 1918	Aisne, France	Killed in action	
	Ralph Hamer Husey†	British Army	25th Brigade	30 May 1918	Aisne, France	Wounds received	
	Frederick Lumsden†	Royal Marines	14th Brigade	4 June 1918	Ransart, France	Killed in action	
	Wellesley Paget	British Army	Formerly Royal Artillery, VI Corps	11 June 1918			
	Alfred Lumsden†	British Army	46th Brigade	24 June 1918	Feuchy, France	Killed in action	
	Arthur Williams	Indian Army	Director of Supply and Transport, India	11 July 1918	Srinagar, India		
	John Arthur Hannyngton (Note: Hannyngton held the temporary rank of major-general between 20 January and 25 February 1917)	Indian Army		21 August 1918	In hospital, Egypt	Illness	
	Edgar William Cox†	British Army	Head of Intelligence, GHQ	26 August 1918	Berck, France	Accident/suicide	
	Lionel East†	British Army	Heavy artillery, XIII Corps	6 September 1918	Ferfay, France	Killed in action	
	Owen Jones	British Army	13th Brigade	14 September 1918	Bagneux, France	Illness	
	Arthur Sanders†	British Army	50th Brigade	20 September 1918	Gouzeaucourt, France	Killed in action	
	Gilbert Follett†	British Army	3rd Guards Brigade	27 September 1918	Dernancourt, France	Killed in action	
	Sir William Kay†	British Army	3rd Brigade	4 October 1918	Magny-la-Fosse, France	Killed in action	
	Stuart Campbell Taylor†	British Army	93rd Brigade	11 October 1918	Mesen, Belgium	Wounds received	
	Colin Macnab	British Army	Retired due to ill-health contracted on service. Formerly served as Base Commandant, Rouen, from April to October 1917	13 October 1918		Illness	
	Edward John Granet†	British Army	Royal Artillery, 11th (Northern) Division (wounded); Military attaché, Bern (died)	22 October 1918	Bern, Switzerland	Wounds received	

== Post-armistice deaths ==
The First World War is usually held to have ended with the armistice of 11 November 1918 though the peace treaties officially ending the war took some years to agree and sign. By an Order in Council made by George V under the Termination of the Present War (Definition) Act 1918 the end of the war was defined for general purposes by the British parliament as 31 August 1921. This is the same date that the Commonwealth War Graves Commission uses for its casualty records. The following generals of the British Empire died between the armistice and 31 August 1921.

=== Lieutenant-Generals ===
Image	Name	Branch	Command	Date of death	Place of death	Cause of death	Ref.
	Sir David Henderson	Royal Air Force	Director-General League of Red Cross Societies	17 August 1921	Geneva, Switzerland		

=== Major-Generals ===
Image	Name	Branch	Command	Date of death	Place of death	Cause of death	Ref.
	Thomas Hemming	Canadian Expeditionary Force	Formerly 3rd (Eastern Ontario) Military District	8 January 1919	Kingston, Canada	Illness	
	John Henderson	Indian Army	Formerly Madras Medical Service	12 April 1919	Upper Norwood, United Kingdom		
	Sir William Williams	Australian Army	Formerly Deputy Director Army Medical Services (Australian Troops in England)	10 May 1919	No. 11 Australian General Hospital, Caulfield, Australia	Illness	
	Sir Henry Macandrew	Indian Army	5th Cavalry Division	16 July 1919	Aleppo, Ottoman Empire	Accident	
	Nathaniel Barnardiston	British Army	British Military Mission to Portugal	18 August 1919	Felixstowe Cottage Hospital, United Kingdom	Operation	
	Sir John Sym	Indian Army		3 October 1919	Edinburgh, United Kingdom		
	Sir Charles Dawkins	British Army	Deputy Quartermaster General, GHQ	4 October 1919		Illness	
	Spencer Scrase-Dickins	British Army	Formerly 37th Division	23 October 1919	Horsham, United Kingdom		
	James Clery	British Army	Formerly of the Royal Army Medical Corps	10 February 1920	Blackheath, United Kingdom		
	Sir David Mercer	Royal Marines	Adjutant General Royal Marines	1 July 1920	London, United Kingdom	Operation	
	Gunning Campbell	Royal Marines	Adjutant General Royal Marines	29 November 1920	London, United Kingdom		
	Frederick Wadeson	Indian Army		10 December 1920	Exmouth, United Kingdom		
	Charles Blackader	British Army	Formerly 38th Division	2 April 1921	Queen Alexandra Military Hospital, United Kingdom	Illness	
	Charles Budworth	British Army	Artillery Technical Adviser, India	5 July 1921	Simla, India	Illness	
	Benjamin Burton	British Army		6 August 1921			

=== Brigadier-Generals ===
Image	Name	Branch	Command	Date of death	Place of death	Cause of death	Ref.
	Ernest Pratt	British Army	Inspector of Infantry Home Forces	24 November 1918	Belgravia, United Kingdom		
	Arthur Wolfe-Murray	British Army		7 December 1918	London, United Kingdom	Illness	
	Alexander Hamilton	British Army	Embarkation Commandant, Southern Command	30 December 1918	Weymouth, United Kingdom		
	Sir Godfrey Thomas	British Army	Royal Artillery, 24th Division	17 February 1919	Harlow, United Kingdom	Illness	
	John Doyle	British Army	Royal Artillery, III Corps	19 February 1919	Halle, Belgium	Illness	
	Lord Basing	British Army	Staff Officer for Volunteer Services	8 April 1919	Upton Grey, United Kingdom		
	Michael Goring-Jones	British Army	57th Brigade	19 May 1919	Seaview, United Kingdom		
	Alfred Lovett	British Army	Yorkshire Coastal Defences	27 May 1919	Scarborough, United Kingdom	Illness	
	John Geddes	British Army	Shoreham District	26 August 1919	Shoreham, United Kingdom	Illness	
	Alfred Ollivant	British Army		31 August 1919	St James's, United Kingdom	Illness	
	Francis Lafferty	Canadian Expeditionary Force	Superintendent of Arsenals in Canada, on the Permanent Staff of the Canadian Artillery	29 November 1919	Quebec, Canada	Illness	
	Richard Helmer	Canadian Expeditionary Force	Director-general of musketry, Department of Militia and Defense	1 February 1920	Ottawa, Canada	Illness	
	Ryves Currie	British Army		30 March 1920	37 Casualty Clearing Station, Danzig, East Prussia	Illness	
	Frederick Dawson	South African Army	Instructional and Administrative Staff	26 October 1920	Irangi, Kenya	Illness	
	Herbert Jennings	British Army		15 January 1921	India	Suicide	
	Hanway Robert Cumming	British Army	Kerry Infantry Brigade	5 March 1921	Clonbanin, United Kingdom	Killed in action	
	Thomas Stanton Lambert (Note: Lambert held the temporary rank of major-general between 31 May 1918 and 14 March 1919)	British Army	13th Brigade	20 June 1921	Athlone, United Kingdom	Wounds received	
	George Milner	British Army	1st Reserve Cavalry Brigade	20 June 1921	London, United Kingdom		

== See also ==
- List of British general officers killed in the French Revolutionary and Napoleonic Wars
- List of French generals who died during the First World War
- List of German generals who died during the First World War
- List of Italian generals who died during the First World War
- List of Royal Navy flag officers who died during the First World War

== Bibliography ==
- Arthur, Sir George (2007). Life of Lord Kitchener. Cosimo, Inc. ISBN 978-1-60206-265-8.
- Bailey, Roy E.; Hatton, Timothy J.; Inwood, Kris (April 2023). "Surviving the Deluge: British servicemen in World War I". Economics & Human Biology. 49 101216. doi:10.1016/j.ehb.2022.101216. PMID 36735996. S2CID 255040319.
- Best, Brian (2017). The Victoria Cross Wars: Battles, Campaigns and Conflicts of All the VC Heroes. Pen and Sword. ISBN 978-1-4738-8738-1.
- Corrigan, Gordon (2012). Mud, Blood and Poppycock: Britain and the First World War. London: Cassell. ISBN 978-0304359554.
- Davis, Frank; Maddocks, Graham (1995). Bloody Red Tabs - General Officer Casualties of the Great War, 1914-1918. London: Leo Cooper.
- Delaney, Douglas E. (2018). The Imperial Army Project: Britain and the Land Forces of the Dominions and India, 1902-1945. Oxford University Press. ISBN 978-0-19-100965-5.
- "Deputy Surgeon-General John Henderson". British Medical Journal. 1 (3046): 628. 1919. doi:10.1136/bmj.1.3046.628-c. JSTOR 20337656. PMC 2341195. S2CID 220014071.
- "For King and Country: Officers on the Roll of Honour". The Illustrated London News. 153 (4146): 404. 5 October 1918.
- Guillemot, Laurent (2017). La Liste de Foch: Les 42 Généraux morts au champ d'honneur. Paris: Editions de Fallois.
- Hammerton, John Alexander (1918). The War Illustrated. Vol. 8. London: Amalgamated Press.
- Messenger, Charles (2015). Call to Arms: The British Army 1914-18. Orion. ISBN 978-1-78022-759-7.
- Neillands, Robin (2004). The Great War Generals on the Western Front 1914–1918. London: Magpie Books. ISBN 1-84119-863-3.
- Pursehouse, Richard (2020). Prisoners on Cannock Chase: Great War PoWs & Brockton Camp. Frontline Books. ISBN 978-1-5267-2826-5.
- Raw, David (2006). Bradford Pals. Pen and Sword. ISBN 978-1-4738-1263-5.
- Ryan, Eugene (2013). Haig's Medical Officer: The Papers of Colonel Eugene 'Micky' Ryan CMG DSO RAMC. Pen and Sword. ISBN 978-1-4738-2993-0.
- Smith, Richard A. (2008). "Henderson, Sir David". Oxford Dictionary of National Biography (online ed.). Oxford University Press. (Subscription, Wikipedia Library access or UK public library membership required.)
- Spiers, Edward M. (2008). "Douglas, Sir Charles Whittingham Horsley". Oxford Dictionary of National Biography (online ed.). Oxford University Press. (Subscription, Wikipedia Library access or UK public library membership required.)
- Sheffield, Gary; Bourne, John (2015). Douglas Haig: Diaries and Letters 1914-1918. Orion. p. 508. ISBN 978-1-4746-0335-5.
- Singh, Gajendra (2014). The Testimonies of Indian Soldiers and the Two World Wars: Between Self and Sepoy. A&C Black. ISBN 978-1-78093-760-1.
- "Surgeon-General James Albert Clery". British Medical Journal (3087): 314. 1920.
- The Annual Register. London: Longmans, Green, and Co. 1920.
- Tyquin, Michael B. (June 1998). "Sir William 'Mo' Williams, KCMG, CB, KStJ, creator of Australia's army medical services - maligned or misunderstood?". Journal of the Royal Australian Historical Society. 84 (1).
- Usher, Max (2017). Never to Return: Brighton College's Fallen 1914-18. Bloomsbury Publishing Plc. ISBN 978-1-78442-157-1.
