= List of Royal Navy flag officers who died during the First World War =

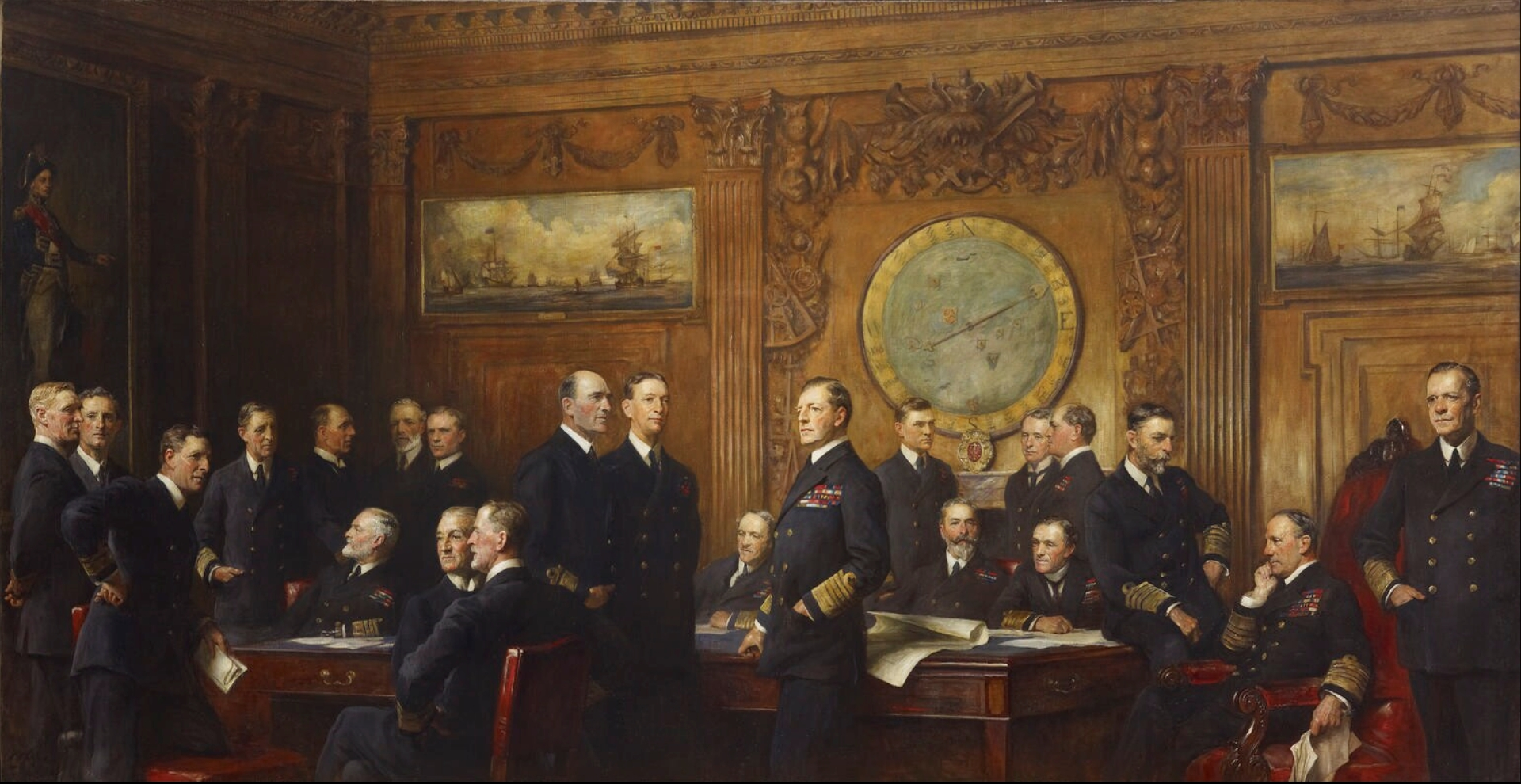
Naval Officers of World War I by Sir Arthur Stockdale Cope. The three Royal Navy admirals killed in action in the war, Arbuthnot, Cradock, and Hood, are respectively fifth, seventh and eighth from left.

The Royal Navy is the maritime arm of the British armed forces and is led by flag officers. During the First World War, these were considered to be officers who held the ranks of rear admiral, vice-admiral, admiral, or admiral of the fleet. They typically commanded groups of sea-going vessels or held staff positions.

This list includes all officers who are listed by the Commonwealth War Graves Commission (CWGC) as having died while serving during the First World War. The list includes ten flag officers who died between Britain's entry into the war, 4 August 1914, and the armistice of 11 November 1918. Listed separately are six who died between the armistice and 31 August 1921, which was defined by an act of Parliament as the formal end of the war for general purposes. Three flag officers were killed in action: Sir Christopher Cradock at the Battle of Coronel in 1914, and Sir Robert Arbuthnot and Sir Horace Hood at the 1916 Battle of Jutland.

== Ranks ==
During the First World War the Royal Navy senior command consisted of flag officers (Note: The Royal Navy has varied in its definition of "flag officer" and the related term "officer of flag rank", with the former sometimes applying only to officers specifically authorised to raise a flag indicating their rank. In the 1913 King's Regulations only the term "flag officer" was used and applied to all officers of the rank of rear admiral and above.) of the ranks (in ascending order of seniority): rear-admiral, vice-admiral, admiral and admiral of the fleet. Ranks could also be held in an honorary capacity, often by foreign royalty. In July 1914 there were 58 serving rear-admirals, 22 vice-admirals, 12 admirals (plus 2 honorary appointments), and 3 admirals of the fleet (plus the monarch George V and 3 honorary appointments). (Note: Of the honorary admirals of the fleet two (German Emperor Wilhelm II and his younger brother Prince Henry of Prussia) disavowed their rank when their nation declared war on Britain and one (Russian Tsar Nicholas II) was executed during the war. Two further (British) admirals of the fleet were appointed during the course of the war.)

In 1914 Royal Navy practice was for rear-admirals to lead divisions of 2-4 battleships; they also commanded squadrons of battlecruisers, with squadrons of smaller vessels often being commanded by commodores. (Note: Some senior captains were appointed to the role of commodore to command a formation of ships; it did not become a formal rank until 1997. During the First World War two classes of commodore were appointed, the 1st class had sole responsibility for commanding the formation while the 2nd class (lower class) also commanded their own vessel. The 1st class was considered to rank in equivalent with the US Navy's rear admiral (lower half).) These units were grouped into regional commands whose commander's rank varied depending on the importance of the region, but was usually a rear-admiral or vice-admiral. More senior officers held command of large sea-going forces such as the Grand Fleet. Many admirals held staff positions on land rather than sea-going commands. The rank of admiral of the fleet was held for life and was granted to the most senior serving naval officers or as an honorary rank for prior service.

Until 1957 the Royal Navy maintained separate branches for its officers, distinguishing the military (executive) roles from others, such as engineering, which were considered "civil" roles. The Royal Navy's engineers had previously had unique rank titles but since reforms in 1903 engineer branch officers had held the same ranks as their executive colleagues, though prefaced with "engineer". In July 1914 there was one serving engineer vice-admiral and two engineer rear-admirals.

== First World War service ==
Royal Navy admirals served on land and at sea during the war. Three British admirals were killed in action: Rear-Admiral Sir Christopher Cradock at the Battle of Coronel in 1914 and Rear-Admirals Sir Horace Hood and Sir Robert Arbuthnot at the Battle of Jutland in 1916; more died during the war from illness and other causes.

The colonial navies (the Royal Australian Navy and Royal Canadian Navy) served in a combat capacity throughout the war, generally under the direction of the British Admiralty. The Royal Indian Marine began the war as a non-combatant force, though during the course of the conflict its vessels were armed and served on patrol and transport duties. The only non-Royal Navy admiral of the British Empire to die during the war was the Royal Australian Navy's director of naval auxiliary services, Rear-Admiral Frederick Tickell.

== Pre-armistice ==
This list includes all officers noted by the Commonwealth War Graves Commission (CWGC) as holding flag officer rank who died between the British entry into the war on 4 August 1914 and the armistice of 11 November 1918. A large number of retired naval officers, including many admirals, volunteered for service during the war. Many accepted commissions at lower ranks in the Royal Naval Reserve (RNR) and served in yachts and other small craft on coastal patrols. The CWGC list these officers at their full rank, even where they died whilst serving in the lower RNR rank.

Officers who died between 4 August 1914 and 11 November 1918
Image	Rank	Name	Command	Date of Death	Place of Death	Cause of Death	Ref.
	Engineer Rear-Admiral	William Thomas Hocken	Staff of the Engineer-in-Chief of the Fleet	28 August 1914	London, United Kingdom	Illness	
Photograph of Sir Christopher Cradock	Rear-Admiral	Sir Christopher Cradock	4th Cruiser Squadron	1 November 1914	HMS Good Hope, Coronel	Killed in action	
Photograph of William John Grogan in naval uniform	Rear-Admiral	William John Grogan	Retired 1910; served from 1915 in the Royal Naval Reserve, captain commanding HMY Sapphire II	14 March 1915	Portsmouth, United Kingdom	Drowned	
Photograph of Sir Robert Arbuthnot	Rear-Admiral	Sir Robert Arbuthnot	1st Cruiser Squadron	31 May 1916	HMS Defence, Jutland	Killed in action	
Photograph of Sir Horace Hood	Rear-Admiral	Sir Horace Hood	3rd Battlecruiser Squadron	31 May 1916	HMS Invincible, Jutland	Killed in action	
Photograph of Sir George Warrender	Vice-Admiral	Sir George Warrender	Formerly Commander-in-Chief, Plymouth	8 January 1917	London, United Kingdom	Illness	
Drawing of Sir Frederick Hamilton	Admiral	Sir Frederick Hamilton	Commander-in-Chief, Rosyth	4 October 1917	Rosyth, United Kingdom	Illness	
Photograph of Frank Hannam Henderson in naval uniform	Vice-Admiral	Frank Hannam Henderson	Retired 1905; served from 1917 commanding Atlantic convoys	26 June 1918	Royal Hospital Haslar, United Kingdom	Operation	
Photograph of Francis Henry Lister in naval uniform	Engineer Rear-Admiral	Francis Henry Lister	Staff of the Commander-in-Chief, Coast of Ireland	20 August 1918	Queenstown, United Kingdom	Illness	
	Engineer Rear-Admiral	Richard James Tench	Retired 1908; served as Engineer Technical Officer, Southampton	1 November 1918	Waterlooville, United Kingdom		

== Post-armistice ==
The First World War is usually held to have ended with the armistice of 11 November 1918 though the peace treaties officially ending the war took some years to agree and sign. Under the Termination of the Present War (Definition) Act 1918 the end of the war was defined for general purposes by the British parliament as 31 August 1921. This is the same date that the Commonwealth War Graves Commission uses for its casualty records. The following flag officers died between the armistice and 31 August 1921.

Officers who died between 12 November 1918 and 31 August 1921
Image	Rank	Name	Command	Date of Death	Place of Death	Cause of Death	Ref.
	Admiral	Frank Finnis	Retired 1909; served from 1915 in the Royal Naval Reserve, commodore at Stornoway	17 November 1918	London, United Kingdom	Illness	
Photograph of Herbert Lyon in naval uniform	Admiral	Herbert Lyon	Retired 1913; served from 1914 in the Royal Naval Reserve, commodore commanding patrols at Malta	15 March 1919	Bighi Hospital, Malta	Illness	
Drawing of Sir Trevylyan Napier	Vice-Admiral	Sir Trevylyan Napier	Commander-in-Chief, America and West Indies Station	30 July 1920	Hamilton, Bermuda	Illness	
	Vice-Admiral	Gerald Marescaux	Retired 1915; served from 1914 in the British Army, colonel commanding British Troops, Paris	3 September 1920	Royal Naval Hospital Chatham, United Kingdom	Wounds received	
Photograph of Sir George Callaghan	Admiral of the Fleet	Sir George Callaghan	Formerly Commander-in-Chief, The Nore	23 November 1920	London, United Kingdom	Illness	
Photograph of Henry Montagu Doughty in naval uniform	Rear-Admiral	Henry Montagu Doughty	Formerly 1st Battle Squadron	1 May 1921	Haslar Naval Hospital, United Kingdom	Illness	

== See also ==
- List of generals of the British Empire who died during the First World War
