= John Fulton (cricketer, born 1849) =

New Zealand cricketer

Personal information
- Full name: John Charles Fulton
- Born: 31 March 1849; Aligarh, Bengal Presidency
- Died: 1 November 1908 (aged 59); Marton, Rangitikei, New Zealand
- Relatives: Frederick Fulton (brother); James Fulton (uncle); Harry Fulton (cousin)

Domestic team information
- Years: Team
- 1867/68–1874/75: Otago
- 1882/83: Taranaki
- Source: ESPNcricinfo, 11 May 2016

John Fulton (31 March 1849 – 11 November 1908) was a New Zealand cricketer. He played first-class cricket for Otago between 1867–68 and 1875–75 and for Taranaki during the 1882–83 season.

Fulton was born at Aligarh in British India in 1849. His brother, Frederick Fulton also played for Otago. The politician and cricketer James Fulton was his uncle, and Brigadier-General Harry Fulton was his cousin.
