= Ralph Broome =

Ralph Broome may refer to:

- Ralph Broome (bobsledder) (1889–1985), British Army officer and Olympic bobsledder
- Ralph Broome (pamphleteer) (1742–1805), English stockjobber, pamphleteer and satirical poet
- Ralph Champney Broome (1860–1915), British Indian Army officer
