= Derrick Trench =

Derrick Trench DSO MC
- Born: 25 May 1882
- Died: 27 August 1917 (aged 35)
- Allegiance: United Kingdom
- Branch: British Army
- Rank: Major
- Conflicts: First World War
- Awards: Distinguished Service Order, Military Cross, Mentioned in Dispatches

Major Derrick le Poer Trench DSO MC (25 May 1882 – 27 August 1917) was a British Army officer and recipient of the Military Cross.

Trench was born in 1882, the son of Colonel Stewart Trench. He was educated at Bloxham School in Oxfordshire and the Royal Military Academy, Woolwich.

Trench was commissioned into the Royal Artillery in 1900, being promoted to captain in 1912. He served with the Guards Division Artillery during the First World War and was promoted to major in 1915. He was awarded the Military Cross the same year. Trench was mentioned in dispatches four times during the war, on 22 June 1915, 1 January and 15 June 1916, and 11 December 1917. He was made a Companion of the Distinguished Service Order in 1917. He was killed, alongside Brigadier-General Malcolm Peake, by a German shell on 27 August 1917.
