= Frederick Fulton =

Frederick or Fred Fulton may refer to:

- Fred Fulton (cricketer) (1850–1923), New Zealand cricketer
- Fred Fulton (1891–1973), American boxer
- Frederick John Fulton (1862–1936), Canadian politician
- Fred Fulton (died 2005), Canadian victim in the Murder of Fred Fulton and Verna Decarie
