= Henry Napier =

Henry Napier may refer to:

- Henry Melville Napier (1854–1940), Scottish rugby union player
- Henry Edward Napier (1789–1853), British naval officer and historian
- Henry Edward Napier (British Army officer, died 1915), British Army officer
