= Arthur Sanders (British Army officer) =

Brigadier-General Arthur Sanders CMG DSO*
- Born: 20 January 1877; Azamgarh, British India
- Died: 20 September 1918 (aged 41); Gouzeaucourt, France
- Burial place: Five Points Cemetery, Léchelle, France
- Military career
- Allegiance: United Kingdom
- Branch: British Army
- Service years: 1897–1918
- Rank: Brigadier-General
- Commands: 50th Brigade; 1st Battalion, Essex Regiment
- Conflicts: North-West Frontier; First World War
- Awards: Companion of the Order of St Michael and St George; Distinguished Service Order & Bar; Mentioned in Despatches (3); Officer of the Legion of Honour (France)

Brigadier-General Arthur Richard Careless Sanders, CMG, DSO & Bar (January 1877 – 20 September 1918) was a British Army officer. A Royal Engineer, he was killed in action in Gouzeaucourt, France, days after being given command of the 50th Brigade.

== Biography ==
The son of Colonel Richard Careless Sanders, IMS, Arthur Sanders was educated at Haileybury College and commissioned into the Corps of Royal Engineers in 1897. He went out to India in 1899 and served with the Bengal Sappers and Miners. He was promoted lieutenant in 1900 and captain in 1906. He took part in operations on the North-West Frontier in 1908.

On the outbreak of the First World War, Sanders proceeded to France and saw service in the field, before holding staff appointments. From April to September 1918, he commanded the 1st Battalion, Essex Regiment. On 9 September 1918, he assumed the command of the 50th Brigade, under the 17th (Northern) Division.

On 20 September 1918, Sanders was shot killed in Gouzeaucourt.
