= John Arthur Tanner =

Brigadier-General John Arthur Tanner CB CMG DSO
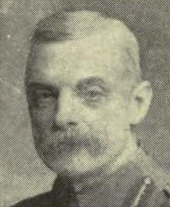
- Born: 27 February 1858; Tidcombe, Wiltshire, England
- Died: 23 July 1917 (aged 59); France
- Military career
- Allegiance: United Kingdom
- Branch: British Army
- Service years: 1875–1917
- Rank: Brigadier-General
- Conflicts: Mahdist War; Third Anglo-Burmese War; Chitral Expedition; First World War
- Awards: Companion of the Order of the Bath; Companion of the Order of St Michael and St George; Distinguished Service Order; Mentioned in Despatches (6)

Brigadier-General John Arthur Tanner, CB, CMG, DSO (27 February 1858 – 23 July 1917) was a British Army officer.

== Early life and education ==
Tanner was born in Poulton, Gloucestershire, the son of John and Marion Tanner; and grandson of the MP Charles Townshend Murdoch. He was educated at Cheltenham College and Sandhurst.

== Career ==
=== 1877 - 1913 ===
Tanner entered the army in December 1877 when he was commissioned into the Royal Engineers (RE) after graduating from the Royal Military Academy, Woolwich.

He served in the Mahsud Waziri, Mahdist and Chitral campaigns. He was promoted Lieutenant Colonel in 1906; served on the General Staff India from 1910 to 1913 and officially retired in January 1914.

=== Recalled 1914 ===
Tanner was recalled later in 1914.

Tanner was killed in 1917 by a German shell in France, whilst serving as chief engineer, VII Corps. He had been assigned to this appointment in October 1915, succeeding Major General William Huskisson, and was promoted to the temporary rank of brigadier general whilst employed in this role.

== Personal life ==
In 1914 the engagement of Tanner and Miss Gladys Murdoch was announced in The Times. They married in 1916. In 1921 she married Major General Sir William Liddell.

== See also ==
- List of generals of the British Empire who died during the First World War

== Bibliography ==
- Davis, Frank; Maddocks, Graham (1995). Bloody Red Tabs – General Officer Casualties of the Great War, 1914–1918. London: Leo Cooper.
