= Fred Fulton (cricketer) =

New Zealand cricketer

Personal information
- Full name: Frederick Fulton
- Born: 1 June 1850; Aligarh, Bengal Presidency
- Died: 3 August 1923 (aged 73); Napier, New Zealand
- Role: Batsman
- Relatives: John Fulton (brother); James Fulton (uncle); Harry Fulton (cousin)

Domestic team information
- Years: Team
- 1868/69–1878/79: Otago
- 1877/78–1883/84: Hawke's Bay

Career statistics
Competition	First-class
Matches	5
Runs scored	70
Batting average	7.77
100s/50s	0/0
Top score	22
Catches/stumpings	3/0
- Source: ESPNcricinfo, 7 October 2017

Frederick Fulton (1 June 1850 – 3 August 1923) was a New Zealand cricketer. He played first-class cricket for Hawke's Bay and Otago between 1868 and 1884.

== Life and career ==
Fulton was born in Aligarh in British India in 1850. His father, George Fulton, a captain in the Royal Engineers, was killed at Lucknow in 1857. Fred Fulton was educated at Cheltenham College in England and then moved to New Zealand, arriving in Dunedin in 1868.

Fulton's cricket career was marred by a severe injury to one of his arms in 1874. He was scutching flax at the mill where he worked in Outram, just outside Dunedin, when his arm was drawn into the machine and broken in several places. The arm was saved by Professor Duncan McGregor at Dunedin Hospital, using Joseph Lister's recently discovered principles of antisepsis. Despite his damaged arm Fulton played cricket for many years, captaining the Carisbrook club in Dunedin and representing Otago before moving to Napier in 1881 and playing for Hawke's Bay. He also served as honorary secretary of the Otago Cricket Association. He became an authority on all aspects of cricket, and wrote a book on the care of cricket bats.

Fulton married a widow, Susan Clarke, in Dunedin in December 1884. He was a member of the Napier firm of land agents Harvey, Fulton and Hill. He died in Napier in August 1923.

Fulton's brother, John Fulton also played cricket for Otago. The politician and cricketer James Fulton was his uncle, and Brigadier-General Harry Fulton was his cousin.
