= Harry Fulton =

New Zealand Military Forces Brigadier General

Harry Townsend Fulton
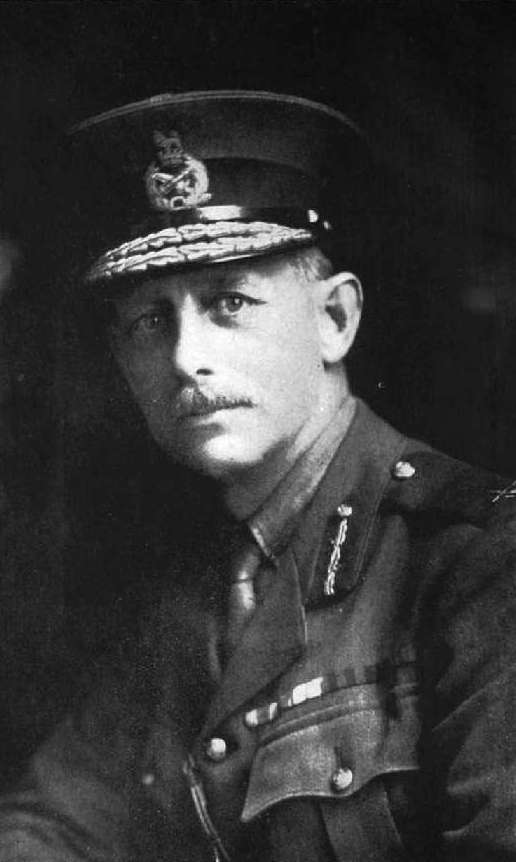
- Brigadier-General H. T. Fulton
- Born: 15 August 1869; Dalhousie, India
- Died: 29 March 1918 (aged 48); Colincamps, France
- Burial place: Doullens Communal Cemetery Extension No.1
- Military career
- Allegiance: United Kingdom; New Zealand
- Branch: British Army; British Indian Army; New Zealand Military Forces
- Service years: 1892–1918
- Rank: Brigadier-General
- Commands: New Zealand Rifle Brigade
- Conflicts: North-West Frontier; Tirah Campaign; First Mohmand Campaign; Siege of Malakand; Second Boer War; First World War; Senussi Campaign; Western Front; German spring offensive (DOW)
- Awards: Companion of the Order of St Michael and St George; Distinguished Service Order; Mentioned in Despatches (2); Croix de Guerre (France)

Brigadier-General Harry Townsend Fulton, CMG, DSO (15 August 1869 – 29 March 1918) was a British Indian Army officer who served with the New Zealand Military Forces during the Second Boer War and First World War.

Born in Dalhousie, India, Fulton moved with his family to New Zealand as a child. Commissioned as an officer in the British Army in 1892, he was seconded to the Indian Army and served on the Northwest Frontier. In New Zealand on sick leave when the Second Boer War began, he volunteered for the New Zealand contingents being raised for service in South Africa and was wounded during operations in the northern Transvaal.

On leave in New Zealand when the First World War broke out, Fulton again offered his services to the New Zealand government in aid of the war effort. He was part of the Samoa Expeditionary Force and later served on the Western Front with the New Zealand Expeditionary Force (NZEF). He led the New Zealand Rifle Brigade during the Somme Offensive and the Battle of Messines. He died in 1918 as a result of wounds received when his headquarters was shelled by artillery. He was the third and last brigadier-general to be killed on active service with the NZEF during the war.

== Early life ==
Fulton was born at Dalhousie in India on 15 August 1869. His father, John (1826–1899), was a lieutenant-general in the Royal Artillery and served with the Indian Army. His family immigrated to Otago, in New Zealand, where Fulton attended Dunedin High School. He became involved with his school's Cadet Corps unit, and from 1887 served for four years as a lieutenant in the Dunedin City Guards.

== Military career ==
In April 1892, Fulton was commissioned in the British Army with the rank of second lieutenant in the Argyll and Sutherland Highlanders. Later that year he transferred to the West Yorkshire Regiment, with which he would serve for two years. Promoted to lieutenant in 1894, he transferred to the Indian Staff Corps, which provided officers for the regiments of the Indian Army. He served with the 26th Madras Native Infantry and then the 39th Bengal Infantry.

In December 1897, Fulton was appointed to command of a company in the 2/2nd Prince of Wales's Own Gurkha Rifles. He served during the Tirah and Mohmand Campaigns of 1897 and 1898. He also participated in the siege of Malakand as a member of the Malakand Field Force.

=== Second Boer War ===
In 1899, Fulton was on sick leave from the Indian Army and following the outbreak of the Second Boer War, volunteered for service with the New Zealand contingents being raised for the war. He was appointed commander of No. 9 Company, 4th New Zealand Contingent, which was attached to the Rhodesian Field Force. It conducted operations against Boer commandos in the northern Transvaal around the town of Ottoshoop, during which Fulton was severely wounded. Upon his recovery, he returned to his Indian Army regiment. Promoted to captain, he was later invested as a Companion of the Distinguished Service Order in recognition of his services in South Africa. He continued to serve in India and, while serving in Bengal, was inducted as a freemason at the Lodge of Harmony No. 438 E.C.

=== First World War ===
By the outbreak of the First World War in the summer of 1914, Fulton had advanced in rank to major, having been promoted to that rank in June 1910. In New Zealand on leave when Britain declared war on the German Empire on 4 August 1914, he offered his services to the New Zealand Government the following day. Made an acting lieutenant colonel, he was placed in command of the infantry battalion that was to be part of the Samoan Expeditionary Force (SEF) intended to occupy German Samoa. in response to a request of the British government. The SEF sailed from Wellington on 15 August and the Occupation of German Samoa was bloodlessly achieved on 29 August when the New Zealanders landed at Apia. After serving occupation duty for several months, the main contingent of the SEF returned to New Zealand in April 1915.

==== Senussi campaign ====
On his return to New Zealand, Fulton was given command of the 4th Reinforcements which was expected to embark for Egypt on 16 April. However, before the contingent sailed, he was appointed commander of a regiment to be formed from the 5th Reinforcements at Trentham Military Camp. Fulton undertook training of the regiment, initially known as the Trentham Regiment and comprising two battalions, designated 1st and 2nd Battalions respectively, until October, at which time it travelled to Egypt.

The regiment, now officially designated the New Zealand Rifle Brigade (NZRB), arrived in Egypt in November 1915. The 2nd Battalion, under Lieutenant-Colonel A. E. Stewart, was assigned to assist the Western Frontier Force (WFF) which at the time was participating in the Senussi Campaign. The 1st Battalion, under Fulton's command, was initially based in Cairo but was called up as reinforcements for the WFF later in the campaign. Fulton remained in Cairo for a time supervising the transfer of 2nd Battalion to the WFF but by January 1916 joined his battalion in the field at Mersa Matruh where it remained until the end of January. It then joined the New Zealand Division, then being formed in Cairo. Both battalions had conducted themselves well in garrison and offensive operations against the Senussi, and on their departure, Major-General A. Wallace, commander of Western Frontier Force, expressed his regret "at losing the comradeship of a reliable body of men of whom England may well be proud."

The NZRB was then put under the command of Brigadier-General William Braithwaite, newly arrived from Gallipoli, with Fulton reverting to command of the brigade's 1st Battalion. However, when the 2nd Infantry Brigade was established as part of the New Zealand Division, Braithwaite was appointed its commander and Fulton was promoted to temporary brigadier general while employed in this role. In March 1916, the brigade was brought up to its full complement with the arrival in Egypt of its 3rd and 4th battalions. The following month, the New Zealand Division departed for France.

==== Western Front ====
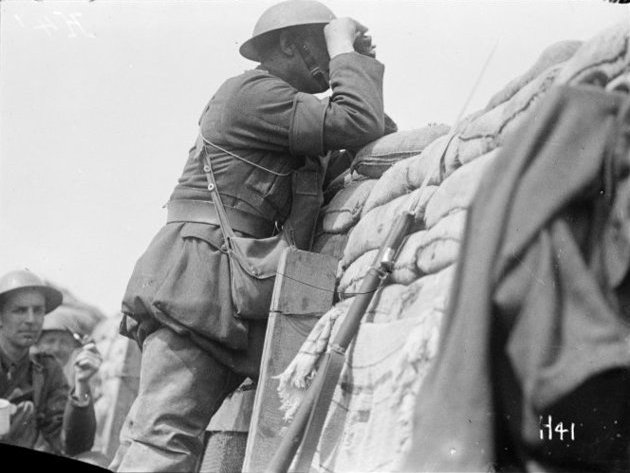
Brigadier-General Harry Fulton inspecting the German lines near Messines, May 1917

After serving a spell in the Armentières sector of the Western Front, Fulton led the NZRB in its first major engagement of the war, the Battle of Flers-Courcelette. This took place in mid-September 1916 during the Somme Offensive, and for a portion of the battle, two battalions of the 1st Infantry Brigade came under Fulton's command. Slightly wounded during the battle, he was invested as a Companion of the Order of St Michael and St George for his leadership.

Fulton led the NZRB during the successful Battle of Messines in June 1917, but took ill immediately after the battle and was hospitalised for several days. Shortly after his return to the front lines in late July, he was appointed commander of the 4th New Zealand Infantry Brigade Reserve Camp, better known as Sling Camp, for a three-month period. In his absence, the NZRB participated in the Battle of Passchendaele in October. Its morale already low because of the loss of two successive commanders, (Note: Fulton's replacement, Brigadier-General Francis Earl Johnston was killed by a sniper in August; Johnston's replacement, Lieutenant-Colonel Robert Young, was severely wounded within a few days of taking command.) and lacking in preparation for the latter battle having been employed during the previous month in laying cables and constructing banking, the brigade's losses during Passchendaele were significant. Fulton returned to the brigade in November, and despite his time away, was awarded the Croix de Guerre in December 1917. He had also been mentioned in despatches twice during the year.

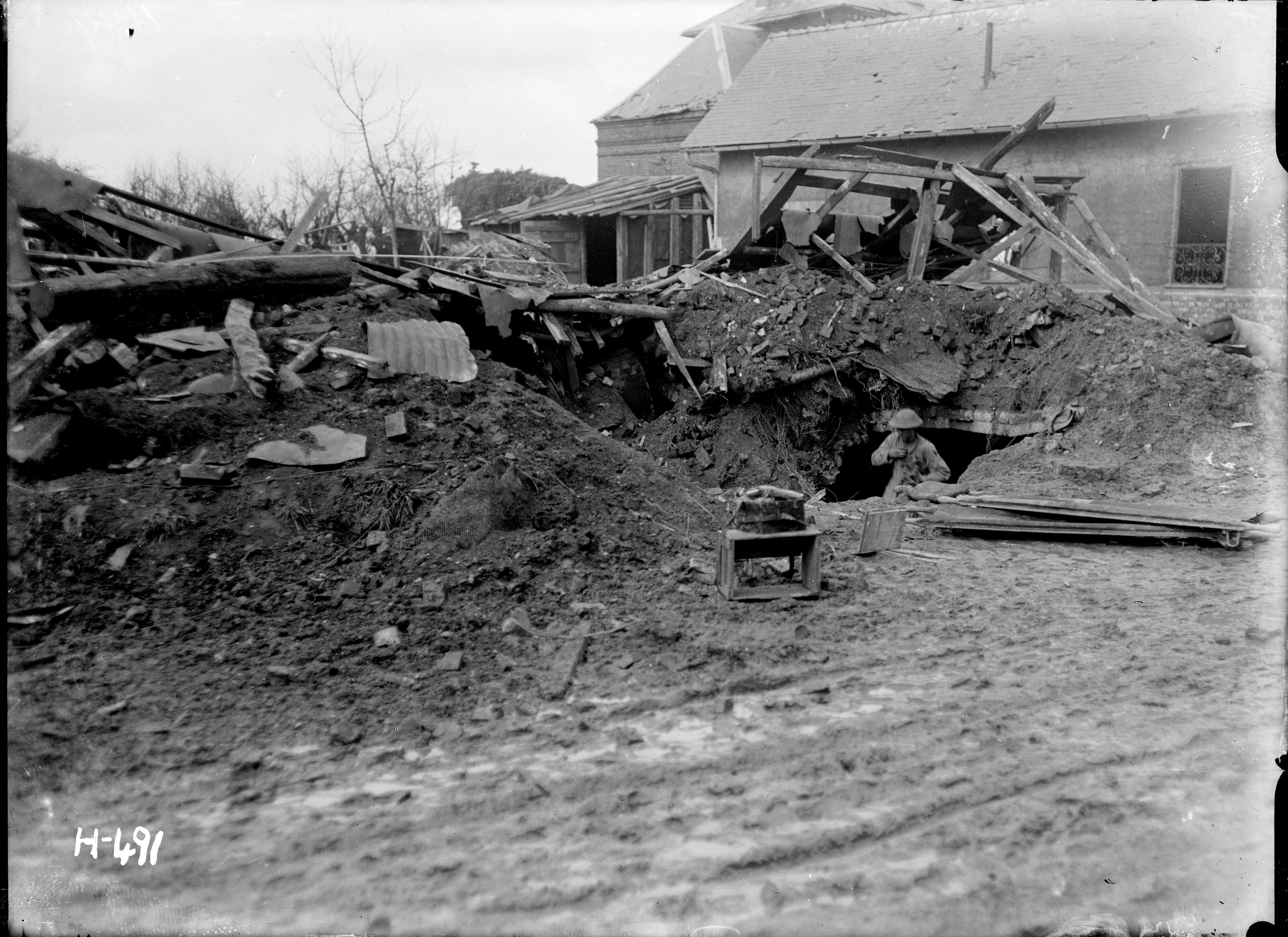
Fulton's headquarters after it was damaged by the artillery barrage that mortally wounded him.

In February 1918, having been in the front line for four months, the brigade entered a period of rest and training during which Fulton took leave. He returned to the Western Front in late March 1918, and resumed command of the NZRB on 27 March 1918. The day after his arrival, his headquarters at Colincamps was hit by an artillery barrage which injured Fulton and killed several of his staff. He died of his wounds the following day and was buried at Doullens Military Cemetery. Although stern and a strict disciplinarian, Fulton was respected by the soldiers of his command. He was the last of three brigadier-generals to be killed while serving with the NZEF during the war. (Note: The others were Charles Henry Brown and Francis Earl Johnston, both of whom were killed in 1917.) He was survived by his wife of 13 years who was a nurse at the New Zealand General Hospital at Brockenhurst in England at the time of his death. The couple had no children.

== See also ==
- List of generals of the British Empire who died during the First World War
