= Norman Tom Nickalls =

British Army officer during WWI

Brigadier-General Norman Tom Nickalls
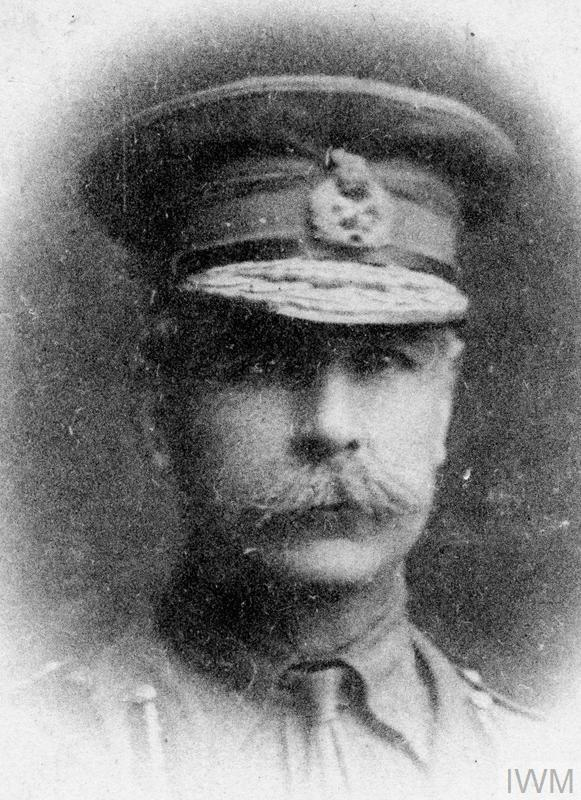
- Born: April 1864
- Died: 26 September 1915 (aged 51)
- Military career
- Allegiance: United Kingdom
- Branch: British Army
- Service years: 1886–1915
- Rank: Brigadier General
- Unit: 17th Lancers
- Commands: 63rd Infantry Brigade
- Conflicts: Second Boer War; First World War

Brigadier-General Norman Tom Nickalls (April 1864 – 26 September 1915) was a British Army officer who lost his life in the Battle of Loos during the First World War.

== Military career ==
Norman Tom Nickalls was born in April 1864 and received his education at Eton College. After serving in the 3rd (West Kent Militia) Battalion, Queen's Own (Royal West Kent Regiment) he was commissioned into the 17th Lancers in November 1886, and later served in the Second Boer War from 1901 to 1902. He was raised to lieutenant colonel and took command of the 17th Lancers in October 1907 and was promoted to colonel in August 1911.

On 5 August 1914, a day after the British entry into World War I, Nickalls was promoted to the temporary rank of brigadier general and was soon afterwards appointed to the command of the 63rd Infantry Brigade, one of three infantry brigades which formed part of the 21st Division, and was composed of civilian volunteers who had volunteered for service with Kitchener's Army.

The next few months were, for Nickall's brigade, spent in training for eventual overseas service until August 1915 when it departed for the Western Front. The brigade, along with its commander, first saw action during the controversial Battle of Loos in September, where Nickalls was, according to the brigade's war diary for 26 September, the first day of the battle:

Action at the Chalk Pit. Brigadier-General N. T. Nickalls, commanding the Brigade, wounded and missing.

In an appendix to the diary:

It must have been about this time that Brigadier-General Nickalls was hit. One officer (Major Bullock, West Yorks. Regt.) states that he saw him hit near the Chalk Pit, but all efforts to find his body proved unavailing.

Brigadier-General Norman Tom Nickalls has no known grave, his body not having been recovered. He is commemorated on the Loos Memorial.

== See also ==
- List of generals of the British Empire who died during the First World War

== Bibliography ==
- Davies, Frank; Maddocks, Graham (2014) [1995]. Bloody Red Tabs: General Officer Casualties of the Great War 1914–1918. Pen and Sword Books. ISBN 978-1-78346-237-7.
