= Alfred Crowdy Lovett =

Brigadier-General Alfred Crowdy Lovett CB
- Born: 1862; Croydon, London, England
- Died: 27 May 1919 (aged 56–57)
- Other names: A. C. LovettAl; Afred Lovett; Major A. C. Lovett
- Military career
- Allegiance: United Kingdom
- Branch: British Army
- Service years: 1882–1919
- Rank: Brigadier-General
- Units: East Surrey Regiment; Gloucestershire Regiment
- Commands: 1st Battalion, Gloucestershire Regiment; East Lancashire Reserve Division
- Conflicts: World War I
- Awards: Companion of the Order of the Bath (1915); Commander of the Order of the British Empire (1919)
- Other work: Military artist

Brigadier-General Alfred Crowdy Lovett (1862 – 27 May 1919) was a British Army officer and military artist known for his illustrations of military uniforms in British India. His work included watercolours and chromolithographs that depicted the uniforms of the British Army during the colonial era. His art serves as a historical record of military attire from that period.

== Early life ==
Alfred Crowdy Lovett was born in 1862 to James C. Lovett, a senior postal department official, and Ellen H. Lovett. He was raised in Croydon, London. Lovett exhibited an early talent for art, securing third place in a competition run by The Boy's Own Paper, a well-known British magazine. He was baptized at St James Church in Croydon on 5 September 1863.

== Career ==
=== Military career ===
Lovett's military career began on 8 February 1882 when he was commissioned as a lieutenant into the 4th (Militia) Battalion, East Surrey Regiment. On 2 September, however, he resigned his commission and later entered the Royal Military College, Sandhurst.

Lovett joined the Gloucestershire Regiment as a lieutenant in August 1883. His service included postings in Karachi and western India, where he lived in Poona, Ahmednagar, and Bombay from 1883 to 1893. Following this period, Lovett, promoted on 27 October 1891 to captain, participated in a military campaign in Aden and later returned to England to work as a military instructor. He was an Instructor in Military Topography at Sandhurst from January 1901, then became an officer of a company of gentleman cadets at the college on reorganization in February 1903.

Promoted on 25 October 1903 to major, Lovett later resumed active service and played a significant role in several early campaigns of World War I, notably at Mons and Ypres on the French-Belgian border. He became the commanding officer of the 1st Gloucesters on 25 October 1911 when he was promoted to lieutenant colonel. During World War I, he led his regiment in key engagements, such as the battles of Aisne and the First Battle of Ypres.

He took command of the 3rd Brigade during the Battle of Gheluvelt after the two divisional commanders were wounded. For his service in 1914, he was appointed a Companion of the Order of the Bath (CB). He was on 1 September 1916 placed in command of a brigade and was granted the temporary rank of brigadier general whilst employed in this role.

Following the war, he commanded the East Lancashire Reserve Division (Territorial Force) from 1916 until his death in 1919.

=== Art ===
Throughout his military service, he maintained his passion for art, focusing on soldiers and military uniforms. His work included depictions of civilians in India and was frequently featured in Royal Academy exhibitions. His art gained significant acclaim for its intricate detail and historical representation, making him a notable figure in Military art.

Despite the rise of military photography following the Crimean War (1853–1854), which introduced a more realistic portrayal of war, Lovett's paintings continued to reflect the ceremonial and traditional aspects of military life.

=== Published work ===
The Armies of India is a book published in December 1911, which features illustrations by Lieutenant Colonel Alfred Crowdy Lovett and text by George Fletcher Macmunn. It documents the development of the British Indian army, showcasing various regiments and their uniforms. The work is noted for its detailed illustrations and historical context and remains available in print.

== Awards and recognition ==
On 16 February 1915, he was made a Companion of the Order of the Bath (CB).

== Death and legacy ==
Lovett fell ill during World War I and died on 27 May 1919, the year after the conflict ended, aged reportedly 57, and was buried in Manor Road Cemetery, Scarborough, North Yorkshire. His paintings gained greater acclaim after his death and were frequently shown in Royal Academy exhibitions.

== Gallery ==
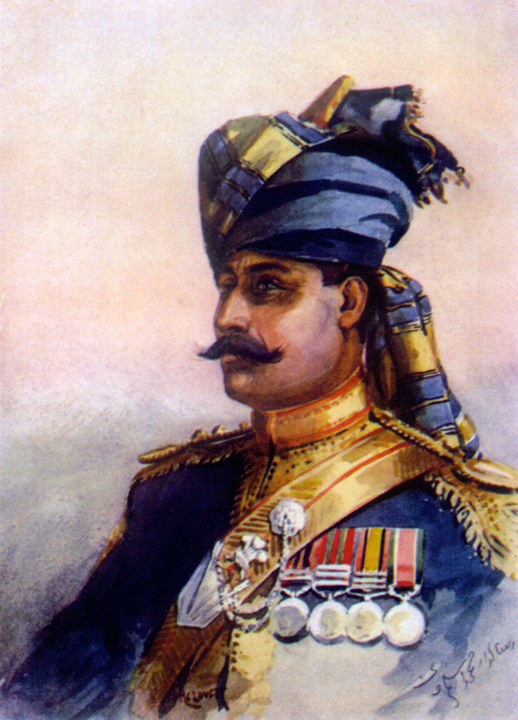
Risaldar Major, 11th King Edward's Own Lancers (Probyn's Horse), now 5 Horse, Pakistan Army. Watercolour by AC Lovett, 1910

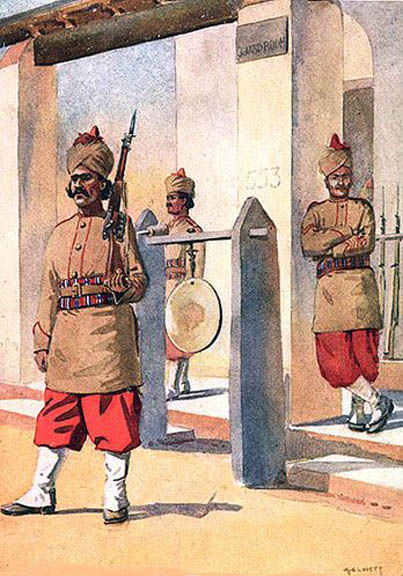
124th Duchess of Connaught's Own Baluchistan Infantry (now 6 Baloch, Pakistan Army). Watercolour by AC Lovett, c. 1910.

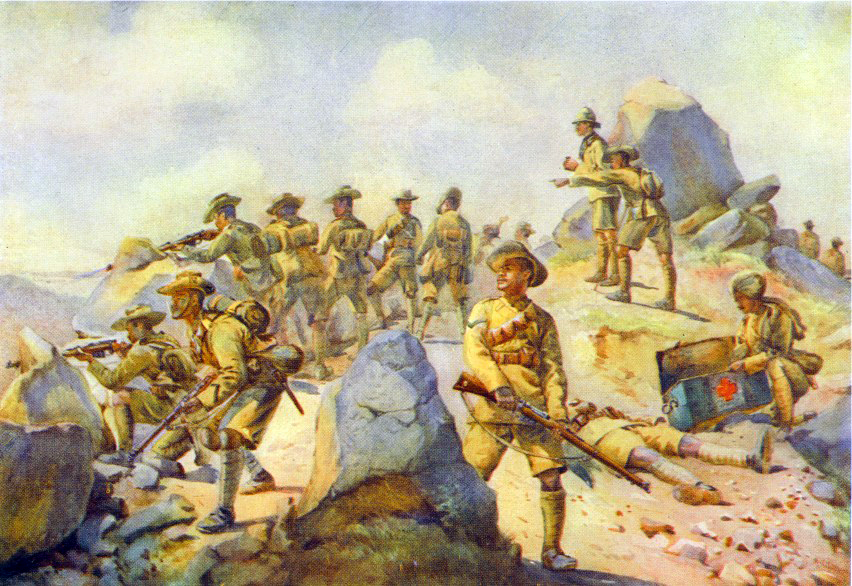
4th Gurkha Rifles. Rearguard Action, 1909

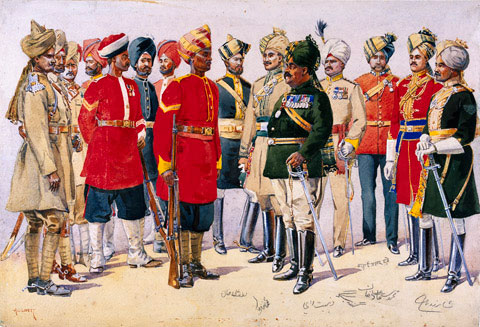
Group of Imperial Service Troops

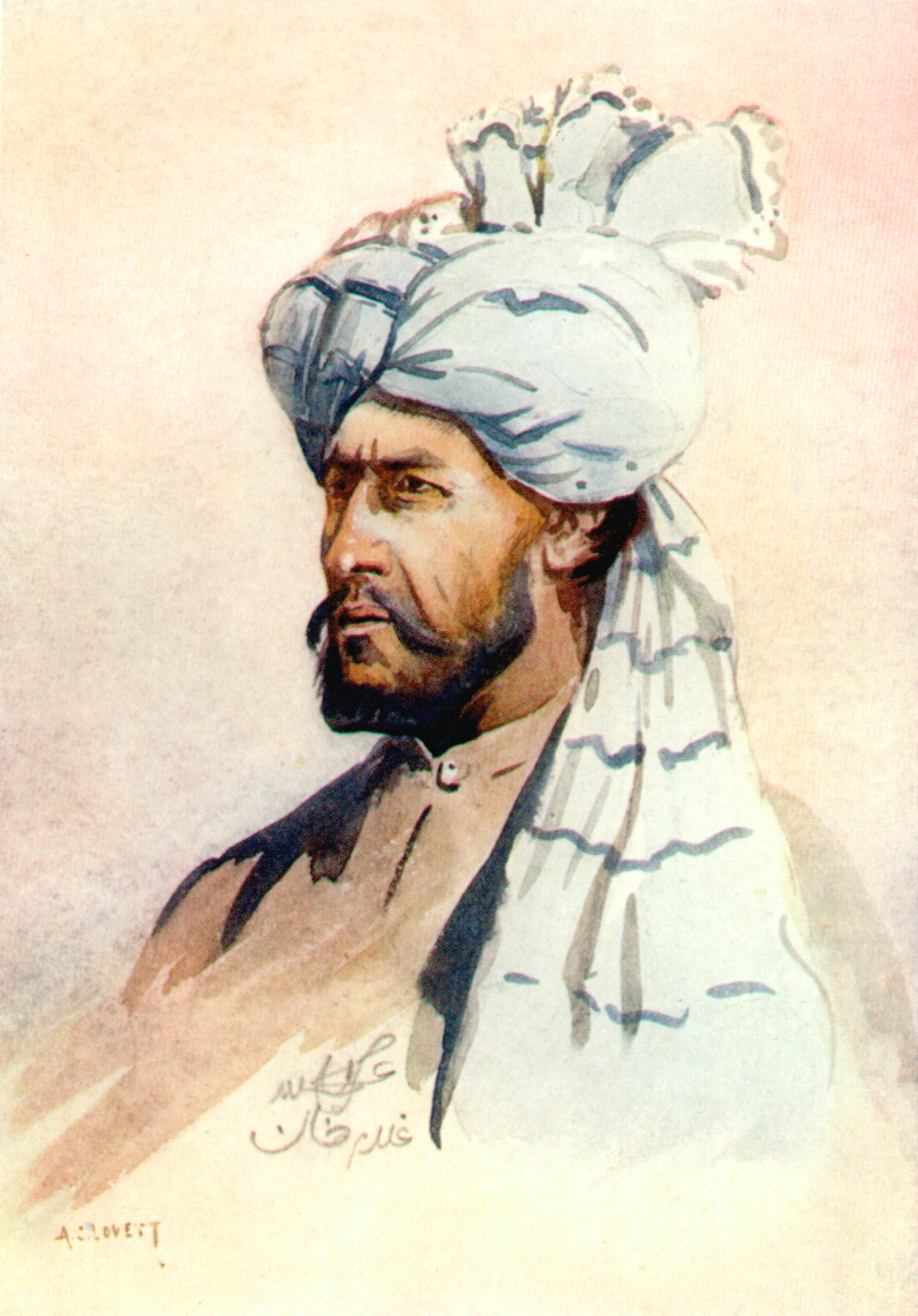
Kurram Militia. Watercolour by Major Alfred Crowdy Lovett, 1910

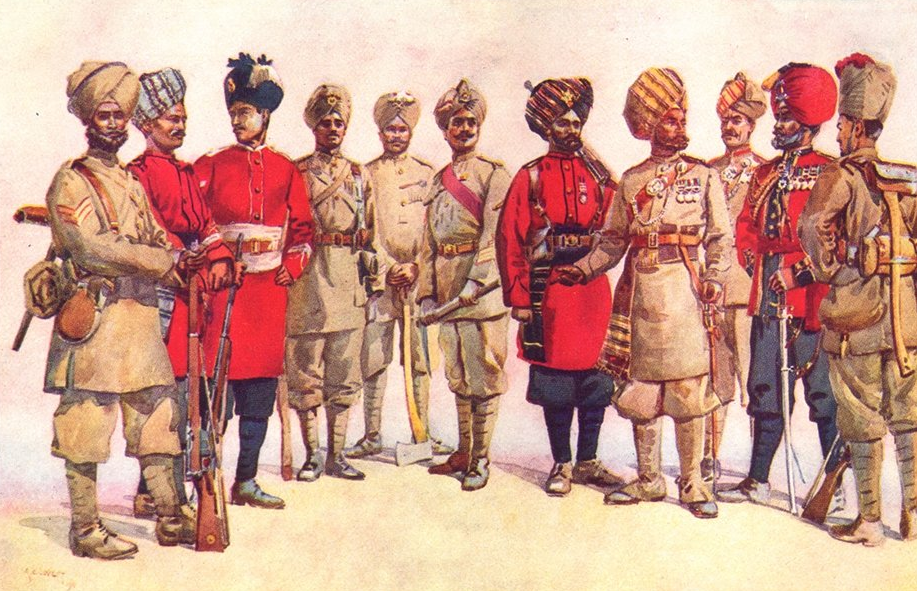
Pioneers of the British Indian Army, 1911

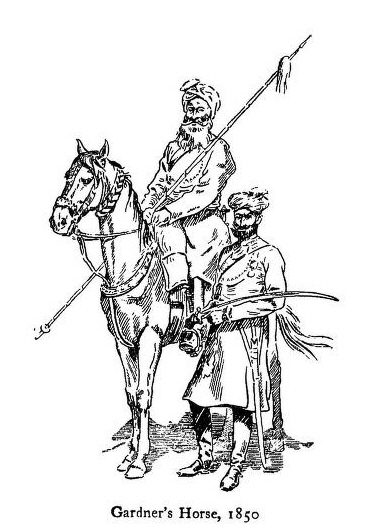
Gardner's Horse, 1850

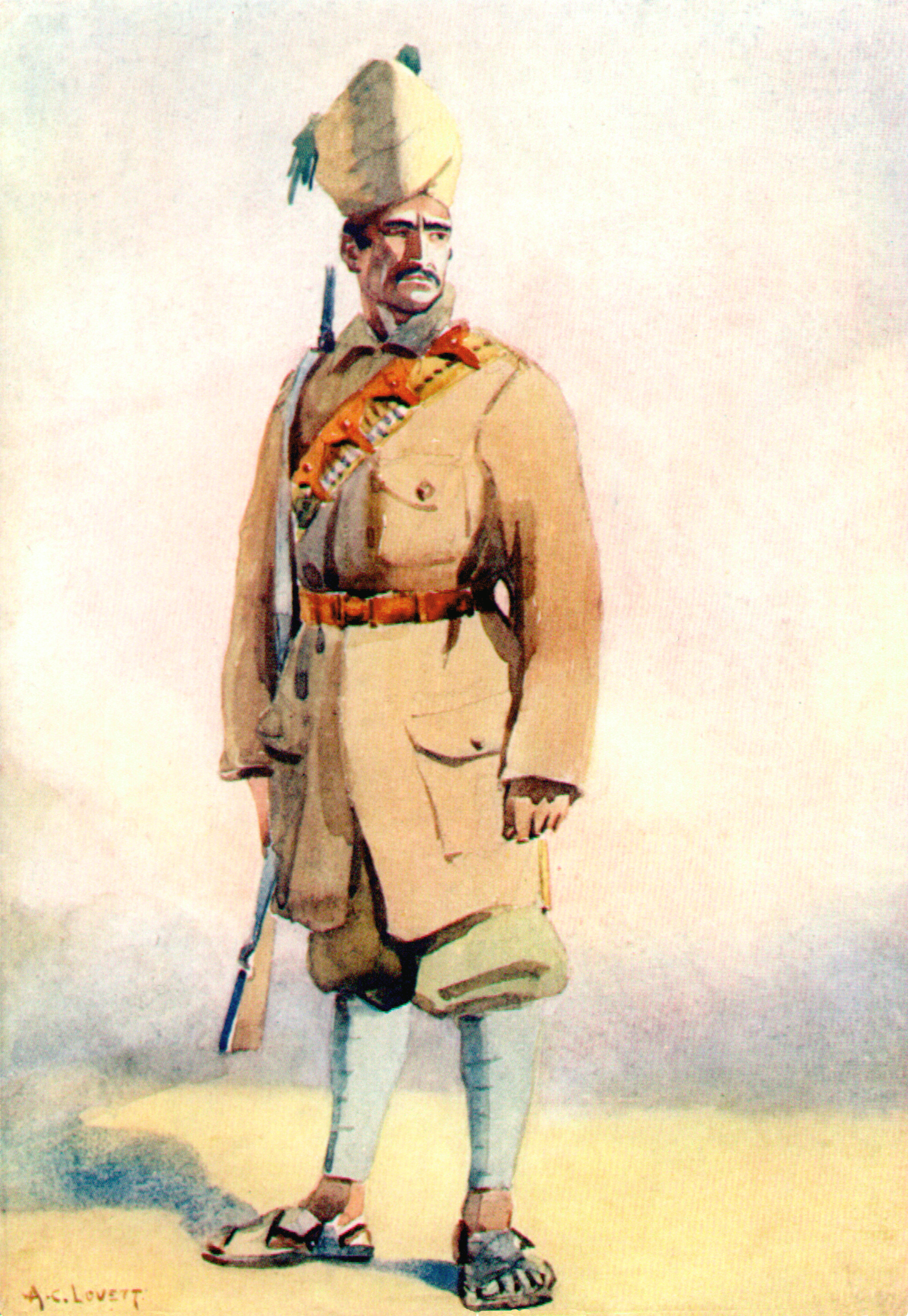
Khyber Rifles, 1910.

== See also ==
- Richard Simkin
- Harry Payne
