= Engineering Branch (Royal Navy) =

Engineering branch of the Royal Navy

The Engineering Branch is the branch of the Royal Navy responsible for engineering, as a branch they have existed since 1837.

Naval engineers are in charge of the management and upkeep of ship-board machinery. Traditionally this included engines, motors, pumps and other mechanical devices, but modern engineers are now responsible for both mechanical systems and high-tech electronics such radar and sonar systems and nuclear-power plants.

== Ranking ==
When the corps was first created, there were three ranks for engineers: First, second, and third. Over the years this ranking system has changed several times:

- 1835 - First, second and third engineer.
- 1847 - Inspector of machinery, chief engineer; assistant engineer.
- 1886 - Chief inspector and inspector of machinery, fleet engineer, and staff engineer.
- 1903 - Standard executive rank titles with an "engineer" prefix.
- 1956 - "Engineer" prefix and rank branch distinction cloth removed finally making engineers indistinguishable from seaman officers.

== Fields of expertise ==
After graduating from university and receiving a basic training, naval engineer officers specialize in a particular field.

- Marine engineer officer (MEO) - deals with the fuel, air, water, electrical, and propulsion systems including nuclear reactors for those appointed to submarines.
- Air engineer officer (AEO) - maintenance and upgrading of engines and electrical systems in aircraft.
- Weapon engineer officer (WEO) - ensures that weapon systems are working properly.

== Students ==
In 1863 engineer studentships were created. Today, there are several different student-scholarship programs available including the University Cadetship Entry, a competitive program in which students enlist and train at Britannia Royal Naval College before going to university.
