= 123rd Brigade (United Kingdom) =

Military unit

- 123rd Brigade sign; this was not worn on the uniform, but on signs and vehicles.
- Active: 16 November 1914–10 April 1915; 27 April 1915–October 1919
- Allegiance: United Kingdom
- Branch: New Army
- Type: Infantry
- Size: Brigade
- Part of: 41st Division
- Engagements: Battle of the Somme; Battle of Messines; Flanders Offensive; Italian Front; German spring offensive Hundred Days Offensive

The 123rd Brigade (123rd Bde) was an infantry formation of the British Army during World War I. It was raised as part of the New Armies (also known as Kitchener's Army). After the original 123rd Bde was renumbered, a new brigade was formed and served with the 41st Division from 1916 to 1919 on the Western Front, in Italy, and with the British Army of Occupation in Germany.

== Original 123rd Brigade ==
Alfred Leete's recruitment poster for Kitchener's Army.

On 6 August 1914, less than 48 hours after Britain's declaration of war, Parliament sanctioned an increase of 500,000 men for the Regular British Army. The newly appointed Secretary of State for War, Earl Kitchener of Khartoum, issued his famous call to arms: 'Your King and Country Need You', urging the first 100,000 volunteers to come forward. This group of six divisions with supporting arms became known as Kitchener's First New Army, or 'K1'. The K2, K3 and K4 battalions, brigades and divisions followed soon afterwards. The flood of volunteers overwhelmed the ability of the army to absorb and organise them, and by the time the Fifth New Army (K5) was authorised on 10 December 1914, many of the units were already being organised as 'Pals battalions' under the auspices of mayors and corporations of towns up and down the country. Foe example, the Tyneside Scottish Brigade of four battalions was raised by 16 November 1915 by Johnstone Wallace, Lord Mayor of Newcastle upon Tyne, and a local committee, the recruits mainly being Scots working in the mines and industry of Tyneside. It was numbered as 123rd Brigade in 41st Division on 10 December and the battalions were assigned to the local regiment, the Northumberland Fusiliers (NF):

- 20th (Service) Battalion, Northumberland Fusiliers (1st Tyneside Scottish)
- 21st (Service) Battalion, Northumberland Fusiliers (2nd Tyneside Scottish)
- 22nd (Service) Battalion, Northumberland Fusiliers (3rd Tyneside Scottish)
- 23rd (Service) Battalion, Northumberland Fusiliers (4th Tyneside Scottish)

The brigade was concentrated in hutments at Alnwick by March 1915 under the command of retired Brigadier-General Trevor Ternan brought back from the reserve.

On 10 April 1915 the War Office decided to convert the K4 battalions into reserve units, to provide reinforcement drafts for the K1–K3 battalions. The K5 divisions (30th–44th) and their brigades were renumbered: 123rd Brigade became 102nd (Tyneside Scottish) Brigade in 34th Division.

== New 123rd Brigade ==
A new 123rd Brigade and 41st Division were authorised on 27 April 1915, as part of a final batch of New Army divisions. They included the last K5 'Pals' battalions formed in the first half of 1915 and did not come together at Aldershot until September 1915. 123rd Brigade was composed as follows:

- 11th (Service) Battalion, Queen's (Royal West Surrey Regiment) (Lambeth) – raised on 16 May 1915 by the Mayor and Borough of Lambeth, London
- 10th (Service) Battalion, Queen's Own (Royal West Kent Regiment) (Kent County) – raised on 3 May 1915 at Maidstone by Lord Harris; transferred from 39th Division 10 October 1915
- 23rd (Service) Battalion, Middlesex Regiment (2nd Football) – raised in July 1915 in London by William Joynson-Hicks, MP
- 20th (Service) Battalion, Durham Light Infantry (Wearside) – raised on 10 July 1915 by the Mayor and Recruiting Committee of Sunderland

=== Training ===
During September and October the infantry brigades and divisional troops of 41st Division moved into the Aldershot Training Area and training began in earnest: musketry and route marches, and training of specialists such as signallers, Lewis gunners and 'bombers'. In February 1916 the division was concentrated in Aldershot for final intensive training, with 123rd Bde in Wellington Lines. Entrainment for the embarkation ports began on 1 May 1916 and the division completed its disembarkation in France on 6 May. By 8 May it had concentrated between Hazebrouck and Bailleul, joining the British Expeditionary Force (BEF) on the Western Front. Once in France the brigades were joined by their specialist troops:

- 123rd Machine Gun Company – landed at Le Havre 17 June 1916; joined 123rd Bde on 20 June
- 123rd Trench Mortar Battery – formed in the brigade by 15 June

=== Service ===
123rd Brigade was then engaged in the following operations:

==== 1916 ====
- Battle of the Somme:
  - Battle of Flers–Courcelette (15–17 September)
  - Battle of the Transloy Ridges (4–10 October)

==== 1917 ====
- Battle of Messines (7–14 June)
- Flanders Offensive:
  - Battle of Pilckem Ridge (31 July–2 August)
  - Battle of the Menin Road Ridge (20–22 September)
  - Operations on the Flanders Coast (26 September–11 November)

==== Italy ====
On 7 November 1917 41st Division was informed that it was to be transferred to the Italian Front, and entrainment began on 12 November. The division completed its concentration in the Mantua area by 18 November. It served in Italy through the winter of 1917–18, then on 28 February 1918 it concentrated in the Camposampiero entraining area to return to the Western Front. On 9 March the division completed detrainment at Doullens and Mondicourt.

On arrival on the Western Front, the brigades adopted the new 3-battalion organisation of the BEF, which resulted in 20th DLI being transferred to 124th Bde; 123rd MG Company also left to join a new 41st Battalion, Machine Gun Corps.

==== 1918 ====
123rd Brigade then took part in the following operations:

- German spring offensive:
  - Battle of St Quentin (22–23 March)
  - First Battle of Bapaume (24–25 March)
  - Third Battle of Arras (28 March)
  - Battle of the Lys (9–29 April)
- Hundred Days Offensive:
  - Fifth Battle of Ypres (28 September–2 October)
  - Battle of Courtrai (14–19 October)
  - Ooteghem (25 October)
  - Passage of the Schelde: On 6 November 11th Queen's tried to get a party across the flooded River Schelde, but the boat sank and the men had to be rescued from the enemy-held bank. On the evening of 8 November, in 123rd Bde's final operation before the Armistice with Germany, a 40-strong patrol from 11th Queen's, assisted by 237th (Reading) Field Company, Royal Engineers, got across in a collapsible boat that could only carry eight men at a time. The patrol found the village of Meersche clear of the enemy, and the whole battalion was ordered to cross. With only the single boat it took until 03.00 next morning, but 11th Queen's then pushed on until midday when it was relieved by the rest of 123rd Bde to continue the final pursuit of the Germans.

=== Post-Armistice ===
After hostilities ended, 41st Division was selected to form part of the occupation forces in Germany (the British Army of the Rhine). It began its advance to the Rhine on 18 November. It was billeted on the left bank of the Meuse from 21 December to 6 January 1919, when entrainment began for Germany. On 12 January 41st Division took over the left sector of the Cologne bridgehead. On 15 March 1919 41st Division was renamed London Division and 123rd Bde was now composed of battalions of the Queen's Regiment associated with South London. As demobilisation of the wartime veterans progressed, the battalions were kept up to strength by absorbing former training battalions shipped from England:

- 2/4th Battalion, Queen's – joined from 34th Division; absorbed 53rd (Service) Battalion, Queen's, in April 1919
- 10th (Service) Battalion, Queen's (Battersea) – joined from 124th Bde; absorbed 51st (Service) Battalion, Queen's, on 1 April 1919
- 11th (Service) Battalion, Queen's (Lambeth) – absorbed 52nd (Service) Battalion, Queen's, on 17 April 1919

London Division and its brigades were disbanded in October 1919.

102nd Brigade was not reformed during World War II.

== Commanders ==
The following officers commanded 123rd Bde:

- Brig-Gen T. P. B. Ternan (to original 123rd Bde) 28 December 1914
- Brig-Gen C. S. Davidson, 30 September 1915
- Brig-Gen C. W. E. Gordon, 23 September 1916, killed 23 July 1917
- Brig-Gen W. F. Clemson, temporary, 24 July 1917
- Brig-Gen E. Pearce Serocold, 3 August 1917
- Brig-Gen M. Kemp-Welch, 23 June 1918
