= Stuart Campbell Taylor =

Brigadier-General Stuart Campbell Taylor DSO
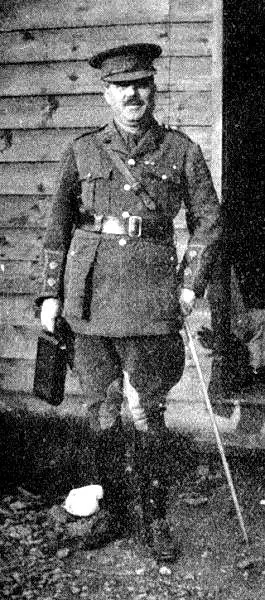
- Born: June 1872
- Died: 11 October 1918 (aged 46) Messines, Belgium

Brigadier-General Stuart Campbell Taylor, DSO (June 1872 – 11 October 1918) was a British Army officer. He was killed in action near Messines, Belgium by German shell fire. At the time, he was commanding the 93rd Brigade.

He is buried in La Kreule Military Cemetery, Hazebrouck, France, the most senior officer buried there.
