= Henry Napier (British Army officer) =

British Army officer (1861–1915)

Brigadier-General Henry Napier
- Napier in c. 1915
- Born: September 1861
- Died: 25 April 1915 (aged 53); Gallipoli
- Education: United Services College; Royal Military College, Sandhurst
- Spouse: Mary Ada Napier
- Military career
- Branch: British Army
- Service years: 1882–1915
- Rank: Brigadier-General
- Unit: Cheshire Regiment
- Commands: Royal Irish Rifles; Cheshire Brigade; No. 11 District, Irish Command; 88th Brigade
- Conflicts: Second Boer War; First World War; Landing at Cape Helles †
- Awards: Mention in despatches
- Memorials: Helles Memorial Panel 17

Brigadier-General Henry Edward Napier (September 1861 – 25 April 1915) was a British Army officer who was killed in action during the landing at Cape Helles in 1915, whilst leading the 88th Brigade.

== Military career ==
Napier was educated at the Royal Military College, Sandhurst, from where he graduated in May 1882, as a lieutenant in the Cheshire Regiment. He was promoted to captain on 24 August 1887, which was later antedated to 23 August.

He was promoted to major in May 1899. and, after serving in the Second Boer War in 1902, he transferred to the Royal Irish Rifles in November 1907 where he gained promotion to lieutenant colonel. He commanded a battalion of his new regiment for the next four years, during which he was appointed to the rank of colonel on 30 August 1911, until November when, upon relinquishing command, he was placed on the half-pay list.

He took command of the Cheshire Brigade, a Territorial Force formation, in February 1912, an appointment which lasted until June 1914 when he left to command a district.

He was made a temporary brigadier general on 5 August 1914, the day after the British entry into World War I. On 27 January 1915 he was promoted again to temporary brigadier general and took command of the 88th Infantry Brigade, part of the 29th Division, which he led in the Gallipoli campaign.

== Bibliography ==
- Davies, Frank; Maddocks, Graham (2014) [1995]. Bloody Red Tabs: General Officer Casualties of the Great War 1914–1918. Pen and Sword Books. ISBN 978-1-78346-237-7.

== See also ==
- List of generals of the British Empire who died during the First World War
