= Charles Henry Brown =

New Zealand Military Forces general

Charles Henry Jeffries Brown
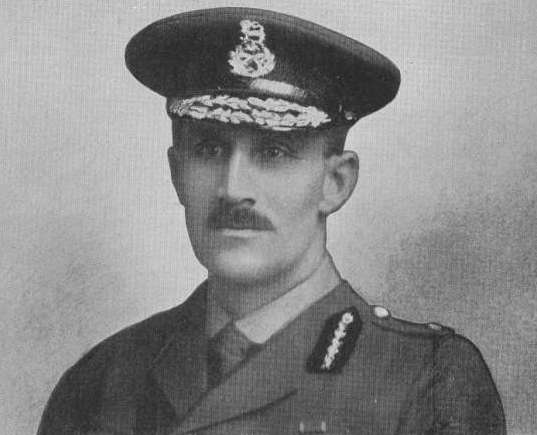
- Brigadier General Charles Brown
- Born: 8 May 1872; Christchurch, New Zealand
- Died: 8 June 1917 (aged 45) †; Le Moulin de l'Hospice, France
- Military career
- Allegiance: New Zealand
- Branch: New Zealand Military Forces
- Service years: 1900–1917
- Rank: Brigadier-General
- Commands: 1st Infantry Brigade (1917); 2nd Auckland Battalion (1916–17); Canterbury Battalion (1915)
- Conflicts: First World War; Gallipoli campaign; Western Front
- Awards: Distinguished Service Order; Mentioned in Despatches (3)

Brigadier-General Charles Henry Jeffries Brown DSO (8 May 1872 – 8 June 1917) was a New Zealand Military Forces officer who served in the First World War, firstly in the Gallipoli campaign and then on the Western Front. He was commander of the 1st Infantry Brigade from February 1917 until he was killed by artillery fire on 8 June 1917, one of three New Zealand brigadier generals who died during the war.

== Early life ==
Brown was born in Christchurch, New Zealand on 8 May 1872. He joined the Denniston Rifle Volunteers in 1900. Promoted to captain in 1904, he remained a volunteer until transferring to the New Zealand Staff Corps in 1911 as a lieutenant. He was group commander of military forces in Rangiora and Greymouth.

== First World War ==
On the outbreak of the First World War, Brown was seconded to the New Zealand Expeditionary Force (NZEF) and embarked with the Headquarters Staff of the NZEF from Wellington in October 1914 for Suez, Egypt.

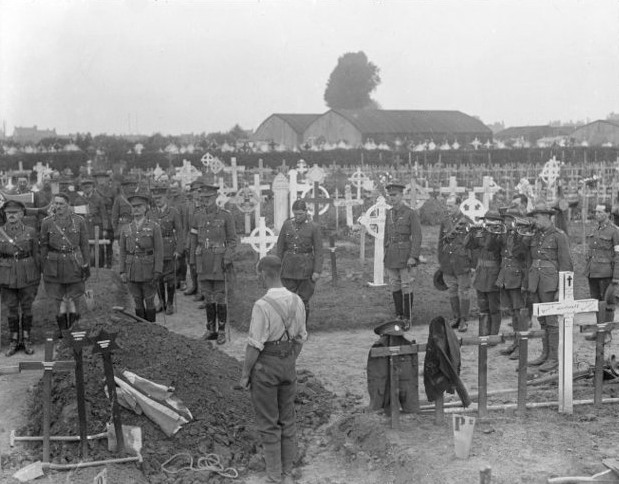
The Last Post being played at the funeral of Brigadier-General Charles H. J. Brown, June 1917, Bailleul, France

In Egypt, the infantry brigade of the NZEF was combined with an Australian infantry brigade to form the New Zealand and Australian Division, intended for service in the Gallipoli campaign. During the landings at Gallipoli on 25 April 1915, Brown, now a major, served as the divisional Provost Marshal. On 5 May 1915, he was appointed commander of the Canterbury Battalion but was severely wounded a month later during a sortie from Quinn's Post as part as a diversionary attack to draw potential Turkish reinforcements away from the Third Battle of Krithia. Initially evacuated to Malta, he was transferred to England in July to convalesce. He was appointed a Companion of the Distinguished Service Order and mentioned in despatches for his service during the Gallipoli campaign.

After recovering from his wounds, Brown was appointed commandant of the New Zealand base depot at Hornchurch for convalescing New Zealand soldiers. In June 1916, he was promoted to lieutenant-colonel and placed in command of the 2nd Auckland Battalion, 2nd Infantry Brigade of the New Zealand Division, then serving in France. He was again mentioned in despatches for his leadership during the Battle of Flers-Courcelette, which itself was part of the Battle of the Somme.

In February 1917, Brown was promoted to brigadier-general and given command of the 1st Infantry Brigade. He led the brigade during the Battle of Messines, for which he was mentioned in despatches for a third time. While visiting the Le Moulin de l'Hospice on 8 June 1917, he was killed during an artillery barrage as he stood talking with Major-General Andrew Russell, the commander of the New Zealand Division.

Brown is buried on the edge of Bailleul, in the Bailleul Communal Cemetery Extension. His grave is close to that of Brigadier-General Francis Earl Johnston, Brown's predecessor as commander of the 1st Infantry Brigade.

== See also ==
- List of generals of the British Empire who died during the First World War
