= Charles Gordon (British Army officer) =

Brigadier-General Charles Gordon
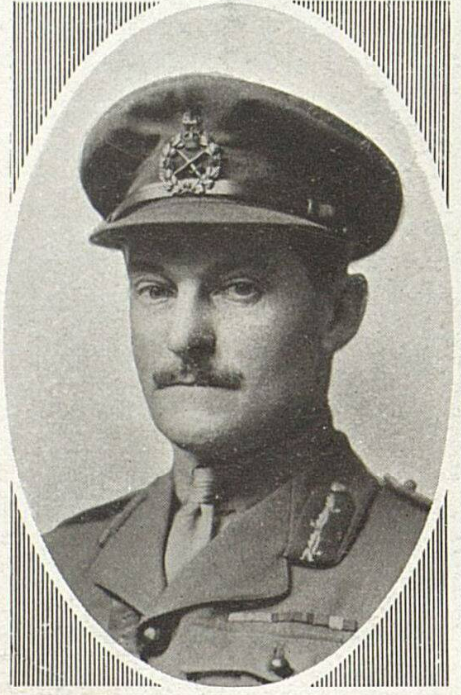
- Born: 25 April 1878; Earlston, Scotland
- Died: 23 July 1917 (aged 39); St. Eloi, Belgium
- Military career
- Allegiance: United Kingdom
- Branch: British Army
- Service years: 1897–1917
- Rank: Brigadier-General
- Unit: Black Watch
- Commands: 123rd Brigade
- Conflicts: Second Boer War; First World War
- Awards: Mentioned in Despatches (3); Knight Commander of the Order of Prince Danilo I (Montenegro)

Brigadier-General Charles William Eric Gordon (25 April 1878 – 23 July 1917) was a British Army officer. He was killed in action in 1917 whilst commanding the 123rd Brigade.

== Early life ==
Gordon was born in Earlston, Berwickshire, Scotland, the son of Colonel William Gordon and Edith Rouse Gordon of Wethersfield Place, Braintree, Essex. Gordon was educated Harrow School. He was gazetted a second lieutenant with the 3rd (Militia) Battalion, The Black Watch (Royal Highlanders) in 1897. In October 1899, he transferred to the 2nd Battalion.

== Military career ==
Gordon fought through the Second Boer War with the 2nd Battalion, taking part in the advance on Kimberley, the Battle of Paardeberg, and several other engagements.

After the war, he went to India with his battalion for ten years, including three years as regimental adjutant, during which time he was promoted to captain in May 1906. In October 1912 he became adjutant of the 6th Battalion, South Staffordshire Regiment, a Territorial Force (TF) unit based in Britain.

Promoted to major in 1915, Gordon was severely wounded at the Battle of Loos shortly after. In 1916, he commanded a battalion at the Battle of the Somme. Later that year, he was appointed brigadier-general. On 23 July 1917, Gordon and Captain George Frederick Pragnall, his brigade major, were killed by a German shell in Belgium.
