= Francis Earl Johnston =

British Army general from New Zealand (1871–1917)

Brigadier-General Francis Earl Johnston CB
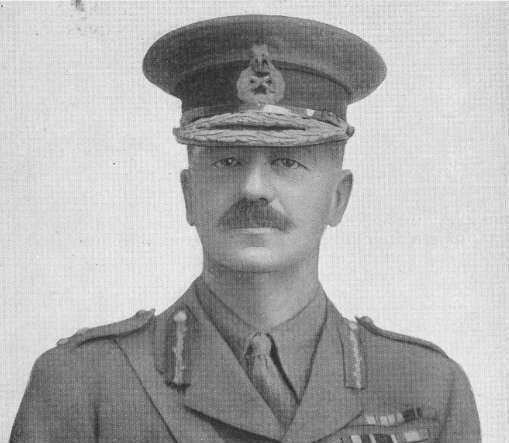
- Born: 1 October 1871; Wellington, New Zealand
- Died: 7 August 1917 (aged 45) †; France
- Burial place: Bailleul Communal Cemetery Extension, France
- Military career
- Allegiance: United Kingdom
- Branch: British Army (1891–1914); New Zealand Expeditionary Force (1914–1917)
- Service years: 1891–1917
- Rank: Brigadier-General
- Commands: New Zealand Rifle Brigade (1917); Sling Camp (1917); 1st Infantry Brigade (1914–1916); Wellington Military District (1914)
- Conflicts: Mahdist War; Second Boer War; First World War; Gallipoli campaign; Western Front
- Awards: Companion of the Order of the Bath; Mentioned in despatches (4)

Brigadier-General Francis Earl Johnston, CB (1 October 1871 – 7 August 1917) was a New Zealand-born British Army officer of the First World War, who served in the New Zealand Expeditionary Force (NZEF) at Gallipoli and on the Western Front.

Born in Wellington, he was educated in England. Joining the British Army, he served with the Prince of Wales's North Staffordshire Regiment in the Sudan and later in the Second Boer War in South Africa. In New Zealand on secondment to the New Zealand Military Forces when the First World War began, he was posted to the NZEF as commander of the New Zealand Infantry Brigade. He led the brigade through most of the Gallipoli campaign. Later, on the Western Front, he commanded the 1st Infantry Brigade and, for a brief period, the New Zealand Rifle Brigade. He died as a result of sniper fire on 7 August 1917.

== Early life ==
Johnston was born at Wellington in New Zealand on 1 October 1871, the eldest son of merchant Charles Johnston, who later became the Speaker of the Legislative Council. Sent to England for his education, he attended Stonyhurst College in Lancashire and the Royal Military College at Sandhurst, where he was awarded the Sword of Honour as the best of his intake.

== Early military career ==
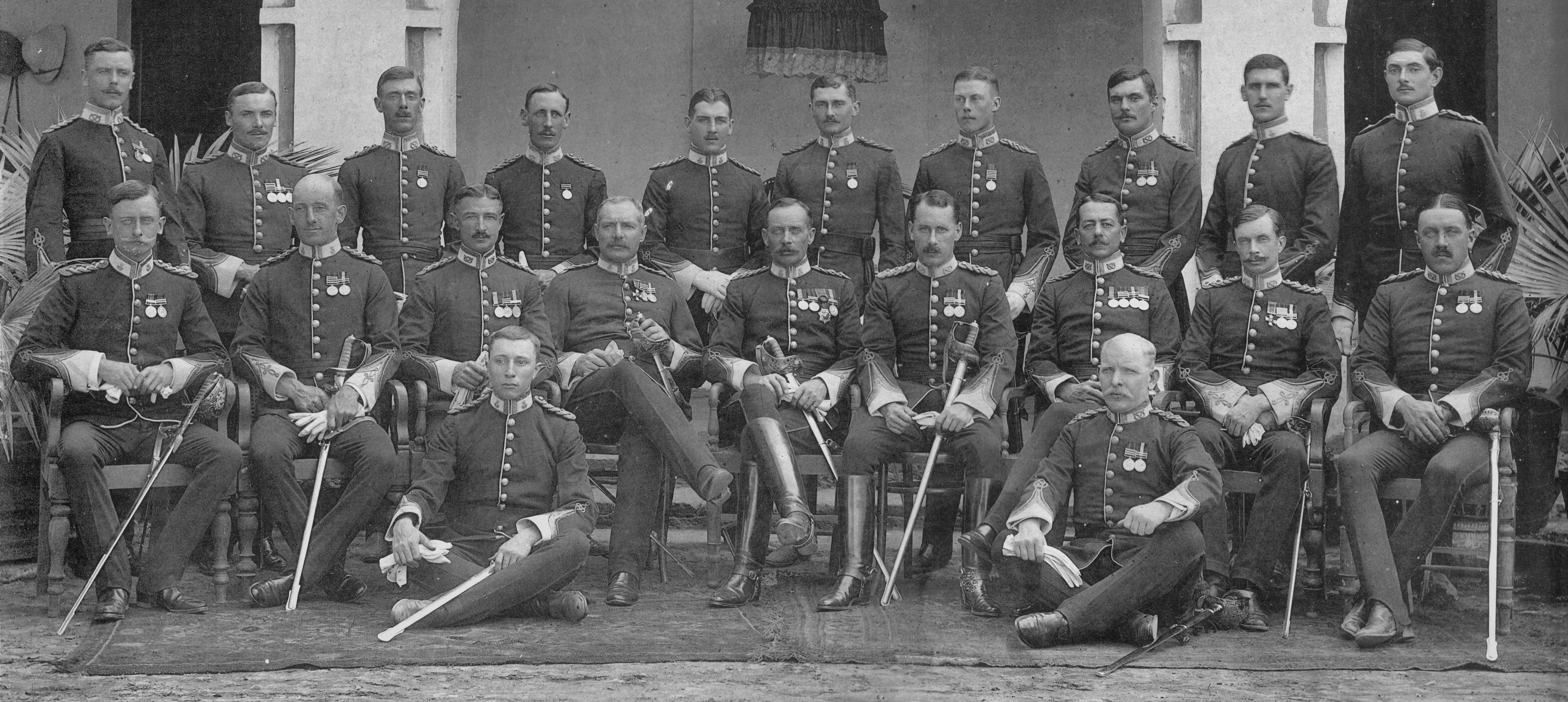
Officers of the 2nd Battalion, North Staffordshire Regiment, outside the officers' mess in Multan, India, 1908. Captain Johnston is sitting third from the right, next to Lieutenant Charles Lyon on his left.

After his graduation from Sandhurst, Johnston was commissioned a second lieutenant in the Prince of Wales's North Staffordshire Regiment on 5 December 1891, and promoted to lieutenant on 30 November 1895. He saw service in the Sudan with the Dongola Expedition in 1896. Promoted to captain on 13 May 1900, he served from 1900 to 1902 in the Transvaal during the Second Boer War, for which he was mentioned in despatches for good service during the Battle of Boschbult on 31 March 1902.

In 1914, prior to the outbreak of the First World War, Johnston, now a major, having been promoted to that rank in February 1911, was in New Zealand on leave from his regiment, which was then serving in India. He had been seconded to the New Zealand Military Forces as a temporary lieutenant colonel, and was appointed commander of the Wellington Military District.

== First World War ==
When the New Zealand Expeditionary Force (NZEF) was raised in response to the declaration of war by the New Zealand Government, Major General Alexander Godley, the commandant of the New Zealand Military Forces, promoted Johnston to the rank of colonel and put him in command of the New Zealand Infantry Brigade. His rank of colonel was initially backdated to 22 December 1914, although this was later amended to 1 September 1914, as was his temporary rank of brigadier general.

=== Egypt ===
Shipped to Egypt in October along with the rest of the NZEF, Johnston's brigade underwent intensive training. During this time, he clashed with some of his officers, notably Lieutenant-Colonel William Malone, commander of the Wellington Infantry Battalion. Johnston was critical of Malone's training methods, for which the latter had already obtained approval from Godley. The brigade deployed along the Suez Canal late in January 1915 to support Indian troops defending from a rumoured Turkish attack. The brigade assisted the Indian defenders in dealing with a Turkish attack during early February, and suffered its first combat casualties. The attack was repulsed with 3,000 Turkish soldiers killed, wounded or captured, and three weeks of sentry duty ensued before the brigade returned to Cairo, Egypt, where it had been previously based.

=== Gallipoli ===
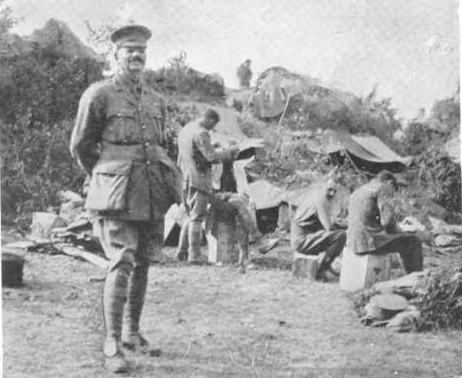
Johnston and the staff of the New Zealand Infantry Brigade prior to their attack at Krithia, 8 May 1915

By this time, the New Zealand and Australian Division, under the command of Godley, was being formed for operations in the Dardanelles, and the brigade formed one of the two infantry brigades (the other was the Australian 4th Brigade). In April, the division embarked for Gallipoli. Upon being landed on the beaches on 25 April, the brigade was under the temporary command of Brigadier-General Harold Walker, the chief of staff of the division. Johnston had taken ill on 23 April and missed the landing, returning to his command in early May.

On 2 May, shortly after his return to the brigade, Johnston led it in operations to capture Baby 700, a hill on the slopes overlooking ANZAC Cove. Johnston did not conduct a reconnaissance of the difficult terrain which needed to be traversed by his men prior to the commencement of the attack. As a result, many units had not reached their assigned starting positions by the designated start time of the offensive. The attack, planned by Godley and with ambitious objectives, was beaten off with heavy losses. In Godley's subsequent report on the battle, Johnston was not criticised for his handling of the brigade.

Johnston led the brigade in the Second Battle of Krithia on 8 May, and then the Battle of Chunuk Bair in August. During the latter battle, he displayed poor judgement in coordinating the battalions of the brigade following the initial capture of Chunuk Bair by Malone's Wellington Battalion. Chunuk Bair was lost two days later to the Turks. Johnston, still in poor health, had spells in hospital in September, before leaving Gallipoli altogether in November for Cairo to be with his wife, who later died on 15 December. He was appointed a Companion of the Order of the Bath and mentioned twice in despatches for his conduct during the Gallipoli campaign.

=== Western Front ===
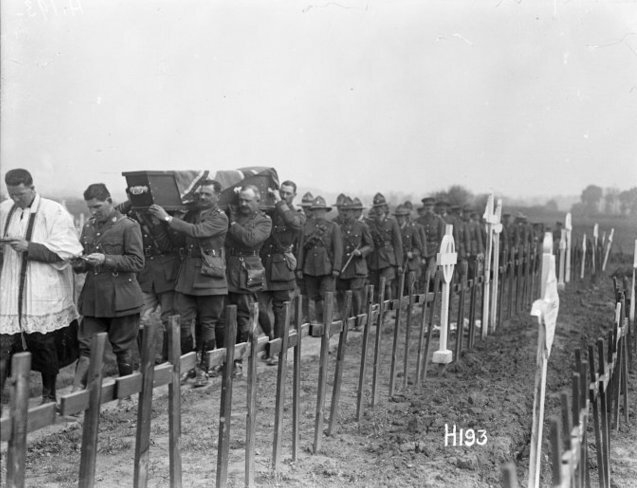
The coffin of Brigadier General Francis Earl Johnston, carried by fellow brigadier-generals, leads the funeral procession, 18 August 1917

Following the withdrawal of Allied forces from Gallipoli to Egypt, the NZEF, now reinforced, had sufficient men to form a stand-alone divisional size formation, the New Zealand Division. Johnston's brigade, now designated the 1st Infantry Brigade, would be one of three infantry brigades in the division. The division was sent to France, where it was involved in operations on the Western Front, and Johnston was again mentioned in despatches for his leadership during the Battle of the Somme.

Still in poor health, in December 1916, Johnston went to England for medical treatment and was diagnosed with neurasthenia. He later took command of the 4th New Zealand Infantry Brigade Reserve Camp, better known as Sling Camp. He returned to the Western Front in late July 1917, this time as commander of the New Zealand Rifle Brigade. Visiting the front lines, he was killed on 7 August 1917 by sniper fire. The New Zealand Official History describes the events leading up to his death:

The front-line posts themselves lay in converted shell holes on high ground about an isolated windmill on the road from Warneton to Gapard, and formed a marked salient with the enemy on three sides. These posts and the rear trenches generally were alike, waist deep in mud. Whilst visiting these outposts in the early morning of 7th August, General Earl Johnston was killed instantly by a sniper's bullet.

Johnston is buried on the edge of Bailleul, in the Bailleul Communal Cemetery Extension. His grave is close to that of Brigadier-General Charles Henry Brown, Johnston's successor as commander of the 1st Infantry Brigade, who had been killed just a few weeks previously. Johnston was survived by his second wife, Alice Seaton, who he had married several months before his death.

== See also ==
- List of generals of the British Empire who died during the First World War
