= Lionel William Pellew East =

Brigadier-General Lionel William Pellew East CMG DSO
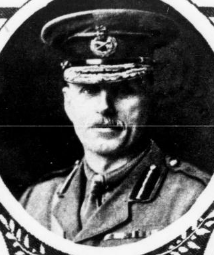
- Born: July 1866
- Died: 6 September 1918 (aged 52) Ferfay, France

Brigadier-General Lionel William Pellew East, CMG, DSO (July 1866 – 6 September 1918) was a British Army officer. He was killed in action in Ferfay, France in September 1918 while reconnoitering for forward observation posts. At the time of his death, he was Brigadier-General Commanding Heavy Artillery, XIII Corps.

He was the son of Rear-Admiral James Wylie East.
