= 88th Brigade (United Kingdom) =

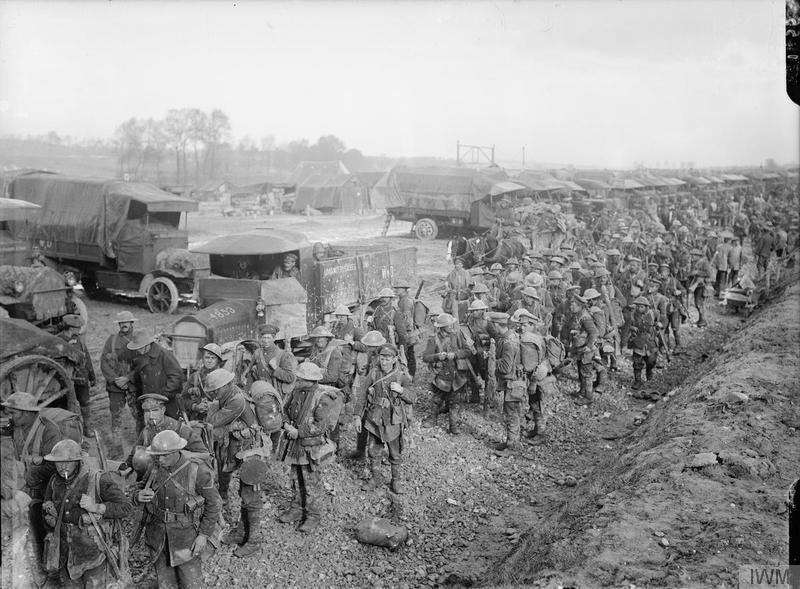
- Men of the 4th Battalion, Worcestershire Regiment gather near Army Service Corps (ASC) lorries after returning from the trenches near Albert, France, September 1916.
- Country: United Kingdom
- Branch: British Army
- Type: Infantry

Commanders
- Notable commanders: Bernard Freyberg, 1st Baron Freyberg

The 88th Brigade was an infantry brigade formation of the British Army, raised for service in the First World War. It was originally formed from regular army battalions serving away from home in the British Empire. The brigade was assigned to the 29th Division and served on the Western Front and the Gallipoli Campaign and in the Middle East.

== Order of battle ==
The 88th Brigade was constituted as follows during the war:

- 4th Battalion, Worcestershire Regiment
- 2nd Battalion, Hampshire Regiment
- 1st Battalion, Essex Regiment (left February 1918)
- 1st Battalion, Royal Newfoundland Regiment (from July 1915, left April 1918)
- 1/5th (Queen's Edinburgh Rifles) Battalion, Royal Scots (TF) (from March 1915, left July 1915)
- 2/1st Battalion, London Regiment (TF) (from August 1915, left January 1916)
- 88th Machine Gun Company, Machine Gun Corps (from 21 February 1916, moved to 29th Battalion, Machine Gun Corps 15 February 1918)
- 88th Trench Mortar Battery (from 16 April 1916)
- 2nd Battalion, Prince of Wales's Leinster Regiment (Royal Canadians) (from April 1918)

== Commanders ==
The following officers commanded 88th Brigade during the First World War:

- Brigadier-General H. E. Napier (27 January 1915)

- Acting: Lieutenant-Colonel H. C. Smith (25 April 1915)
- Acting: Lieutenant-Colonel O. G. Godfrey-Faussett (26 April 1915)
- Acting: Lieutenant-Colonel W. de L. Williams (29 April 1915)

- Brigadier-General W. Doran (26 May 1915)
- Brigadier-General D. E. Cayley (7 June 1915)
- Brigadier-General H. Nelson (1 October 1917)
- Brigadier-General B. C. Freyberg (22 January 1918)
