= Arthur Cecil Lowe =

British army officer

Brigadier-General Arthur Cecil Lowe CMG DSO
- Born: 26 October 1868
- Died: 24 November 1917 (aged 49) Ypres, Belgium

Brigadier-General Arthur Cecil Lowe, CMG, DSO (26 October 1868 – 24 November 1917) was a British Army officer. He was killed in action near Ypres, Belgium, in 1917, while serving as Commander Royal Artillery, 66th Division.
