= 50th Brigade (United Kingdom) =

Former infantry brigade formation of the British Army

The 50th Brigade was an infantry brigade formation of the British Army. It was formed during the First World War as part of the New Army, also known as Kitchener's Army. It was assigned to the 17th (Northern) Division and served on the Western Front.

== Formation ==
The infantry battalions did not all serve at once, but all were assigned to the brigade during the war.

- 10th (Service) Battalion, West Yorkshire Regiment
- 7th (Service) Battalion, East Yorkshire Regiment
- 7th (Service) Battalion, Green Howards
- 7th (Service) Battalion, York and Lancaster Regiment
- 6th (Service) Battalion, Dorset Regiment
- 50th Machine Gun Company, Machine Gun Corps
- 50th Trench Mortar Battery
