= Malcolm Peake =

Brigadier-General Malcolm Peake CMG
- Born: 27 March 1865
- Died: 27 August 1917 (aged 52); Lens, Pas-de-Calais, France
- Military career
- Allegiance: United Kingdom
- Branch: British Army
- Service years: 1884–1917
- Rank: Brigadier-General
- Unit: Royal Artillery
- Conflicts: Mahdist War; First World War
- Awards: Companion of the Order of St Michael and St George; Mentioned in Despatches (4); Order of the Medjidie, 3rd Class (Ottoman Empire); Order of Osmanieh, 4th Class (Ottoman Empire); Officer of the Order of Leopold (Belgium); Officer of the Legion of Honour (France)

Brigadier-General Malcolm Peake, CMG (27 March 1865 – 27 August 1917) was a British Army officer. He was killed by a German shell in 1917, whilst conducting reconnaissance on Hill 70. At the time, he was brigadier general, Royal Artillery (BGRA), I Corps, after having served in the same role as BGRA of the 29th Division.

Peake's military career began when he was commissioned as a subaltern, with the rank of lieutenant, into the Royal Artillery in December 1884.

He was promoted to substantive colonel in November 1916, with seniority backdated to November 1915.

== See also ==
- List of generals of the British Empire who died during the First World War

== Bibliography ==
- Davis, Frank; Maddocks, Graham (1995). Bloody Red Tabs – General Officer Casualties of the Great War, 1914–1918. London: Leo Cooper.
