= 17th (Northern) Division =

- Formation patch of the 17th (Northern) Division.
- Active: 1914 – 1919
- Country: United Kingdom
- Branch: British Army
- Type: Infantry
- Size: Division
- Engagements: First World War

Commanders
- Notable commanders: Sir Philip Robertson

The 17th (Northern) Division was an infantry division of the British Army, a Kitchener's Army formation raised during the Great War.

== Formation history ==
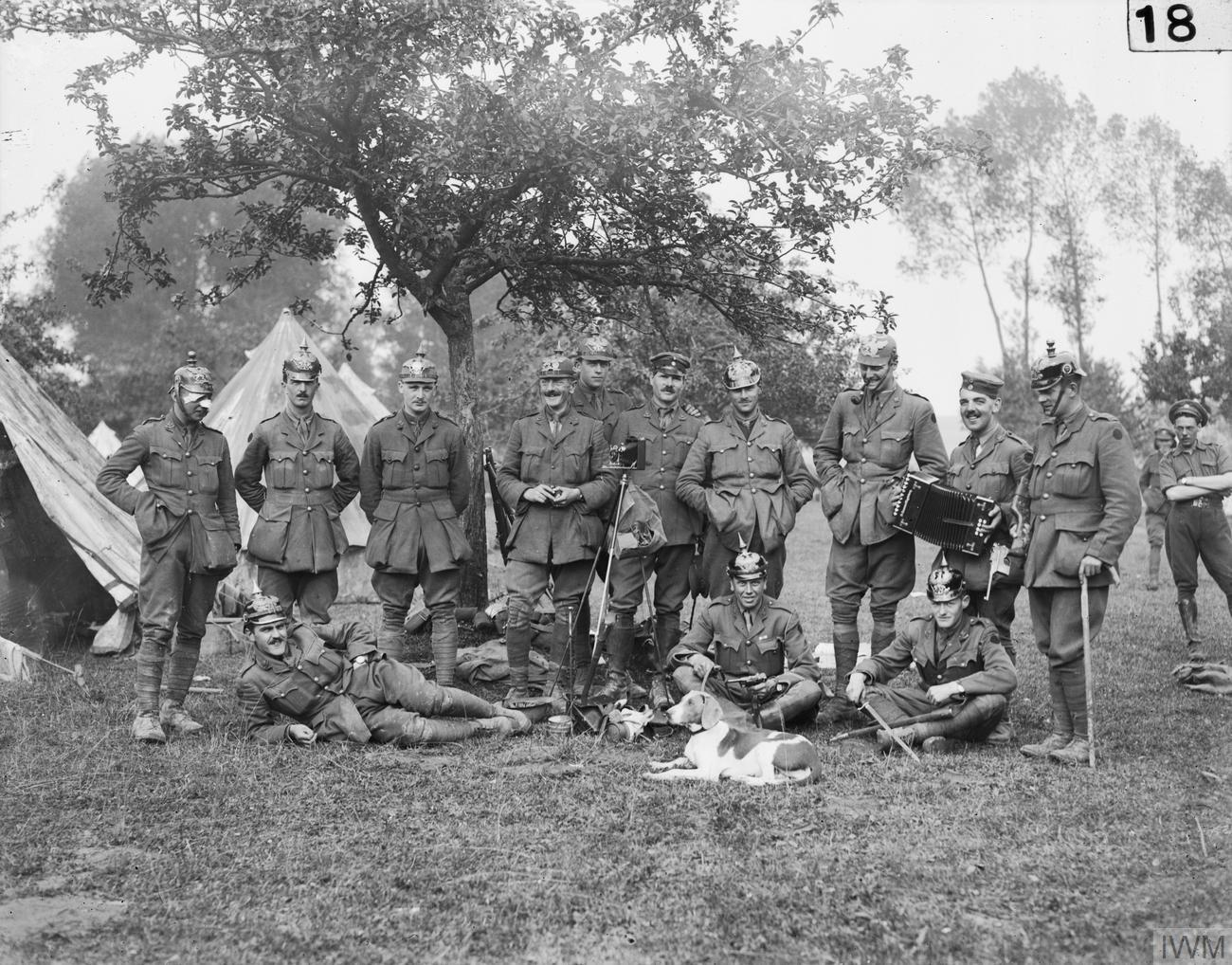
Albert 1 - 13 July: Officers of the 10th (Service) Battalion, Sherwood Foresters wearing captured German helmets and with a tripod camera, accordion and pet dog after fighting during the battles of early July. The dog was found in a dug-out.

The 17th (Northern) Division was created under Northern Command in September 1914, just a month after the British entry into the Great War, from men volunteering for Lord Kitchener's New Armies. Most of the volunteers had had little prior military experience. Worsening the situation was an acute lack of experienced officers and NCO's to train the new men as, due to the huge expansion of the British Army, experienced soldiers were needed everywhere. Furthermore, weapons and equipment, along with billets, were scarce.

The division, commanded by Major General Walter Kenyon-Slaney, part of Kitchener's Second New Army (K2), concentrated throughout Dorset for training, moving to Hampshire in late May 1915. In early July the division sent advance parties to France in preparation for a move overseas, the rest of the division following a week later, moving to Saint-Omer for concentration. The division was to remain on the Western Front for the rest of the war, with most of the rest of 1915 being spent in the southern sector of the Ypres Salient, being instructed in trench warfare.

The division's first major engagement was in July 1916, where the division, as part of V Corps, fought in the battles of Albert and Delville Wood, both part of the larger Battle of the Somme. On the first day on the Somme, on 1 July 1916, the 50th Brigade, in particular the 10th (Service) Battalion, West Yorkshires, suffered very heavy casualties, the highest sustained by any British unit on that day. On 13 July Major General Thomas Pilcher, who had been in command since January 1915, was sacked by his superiors, who were not impressed with him. He was replaced by Major General Philip Robertson, who was to remain in command for the rest of the war.

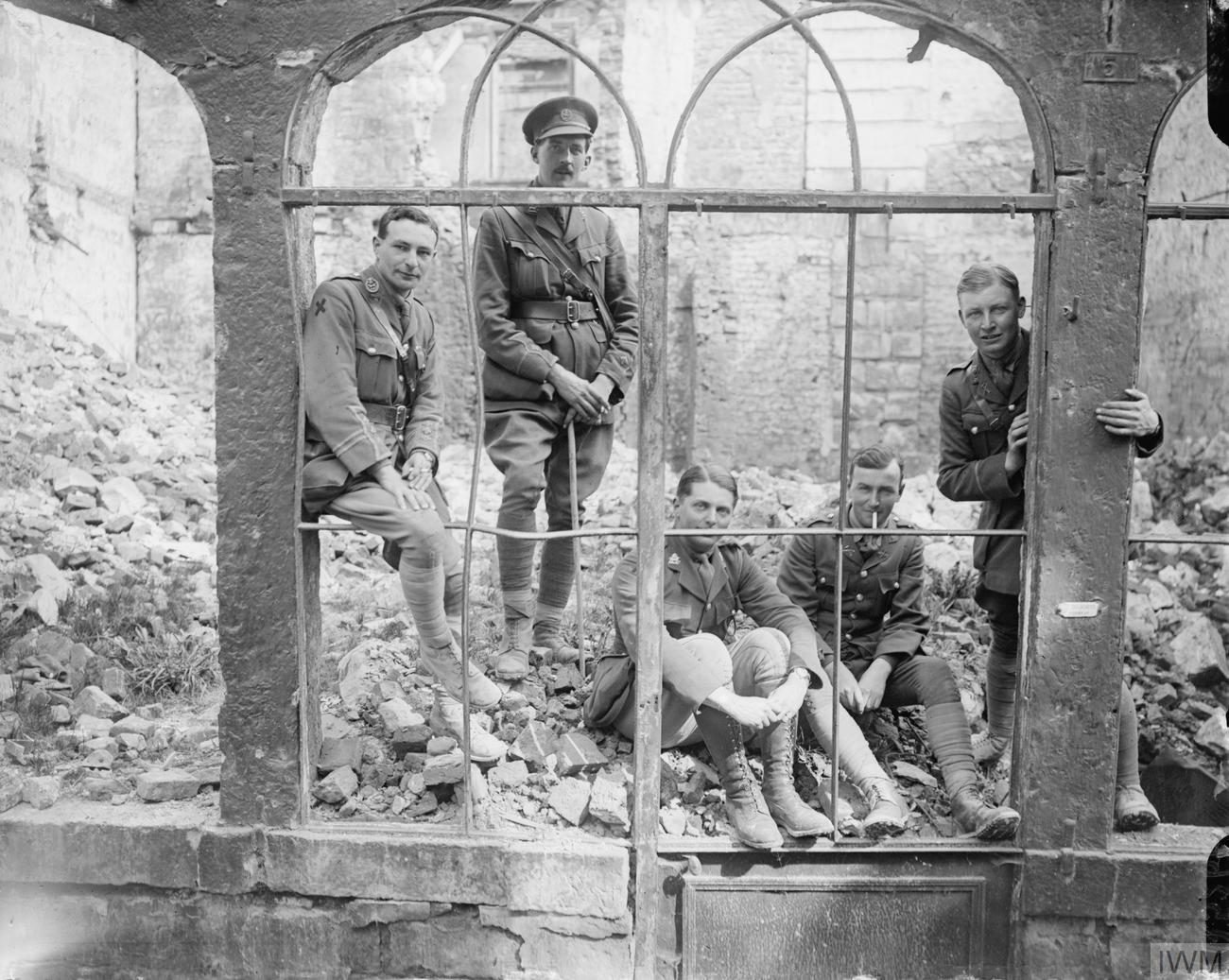
Officers of the 7th (Service) Battalion (Pioneers), York and Lancaster Regiment, in a ruined building in Arras, 30 April 1917.

In April 1917 the division, now part of VI Corps, fought in the first and second battles of the Scarpe, both part of the Battle of Arras, where heavy casualties were sustained. The division later fought in the First and Second Battles of Passchendaele, part of the much longer Third Battle of Ypres.

Early 1918 saw the division resting after the battles of the previous year, again as part of V Corps. The division fought in the German Army's Spring Offensives, followed by the Battle of Epehy and the Battle of Cambrai, both part of the attempt to smash the German Hindenburg Line during the Hundred Days Offensive which saw the end of the trench warfare and brought the war to an end on 11 November 1918.

During the Great War the 17th (Northern) Division had, from 1915, when it departed for the Western Front, until 1918, when the war ended, sustained 40,258 casualties.

== Order of battle ==
The 17th (Northern) Division was constituted as follows during the war:

50th Brigade

- 10th (Service) Battalion, Prince of Wales's Own (West Yorkshire Regiment)
- 7th (Service) Battalion, East Yorkshire Regiment
- 7th (Service) Battalion, Alexandra, Princess of Wales's Own (Yorkshire Regiment) (disbanded February 1918)
- 6th (Service) Battalion, Dorsetshire Regiment (from March 1915)
- 7th (Service) Battalion, York and Lancaster Regiment (until March 1915)

51st Brigade

- 7th (Service) Battalion, Lincolnshire Regimeht
- 7th (Service) Battalion, Border Regiment
- 10th (Service) Battalion, Sherwood Foresters
- 8th (Service) Battalion, South Staffordshire Regiment (disbanded February 1918)
- 3/4th Battalion, Queen's Own (Royal West Kent Regiment) (from June 1917 to 52nd Brigade August 1917)

52nd Brigade

- 10th (Service) Battalion, Lancashire Fusiliers
- 12th (Service) Battalion, Manchester Regiment
- 9th (Service) Battalion, Duke of Wellington's (West Riding Regiment)
- 9th (Service) Battalion, Northumberland Fusiliers (until August 1917)
- 3/4th Battalion, Queen's Own (Royal West Kent Regiment) (from 51st Brigade August 1917, disbanded February 1918)

Divisional Troops

- 6th (Service) Battalion, Dorsetshire Regiment (left March 1915)
- 7th (Service) Battalion, York and Lancaster Regiment (joined as Pioneer battalion March 1915)
- 3/4th Battalion, Queen's Own (Royal West Kent Regiment) (attached as Pioneer battalion 12 July – 3 August 1917)
- 12th Motor Machine Gun Battery (joined 10 July 1915, left 7 May 1916)
- 236th Machine Gun Company, Machine Gun Corps (joined 17 July 1917, left to move into 17th Machine Gun Battalion 24 February 1918)
- 17th Battalion, Machine Gun Corps (formed 24 February 1918)

Divisional Mounted Troops

- A Squadron, Queen's Own Yorkshire Dragoons (left 10 May 1916)
- 17th Divisional Cyclist Company, Army Cyclist Corps (left 24 May 1916)

Divisional Artillery

- LXXVIII Brigade, Royal Field Artillery
- LXXIX Brigade, Royal Field Artillery
- LXXX Brigade, Royal Field Artillery (broken up 31 August 1916)
- LXXXI (Howitzer) Brigade, Royal Field Artillery (broken up 1–27 January 1917)
- 17th Divisional Ammunition Column, Royal Field Artillery
- 17th Heavy Battery, Royal Garrison Artillery (raised with the division but moved independently to France and joined XXIX Heavy Artillery Brigade on 9 October 1915)
- V.17 Heavy Trench Mortar Battery Royal Field Artillery (joined 22 August 1916, left 28 February 1918)
- X.17, Y.17 and Z.17 Medium Mortar Batteries Royal Field Artillery (formed by 22 August 1916; by 28 February 1918, Z broken up and batteries reorganised to have 6 x 6-inch weapons each)

Royal Engineers

- 77th Field Company, Royal Engineers
- 78th Field Company, Royal Engineers
- 93rd Field Company, Royal Engineers
- 17th Divisional Signals Company, Royal Engineers

Royal Army Medical Corps

- 51st Field Ambulance, Royal Army Medical Corps
- 52nd Field Ambulance, Royal Army Medical Corps
- 53rd Field Ambulance, Royal Army Medical Corpe
- 34th Sanitary Section, Royal Army Medical Corps (left 10 March 1917)

Other Divisional Troops

- 17th Divisional Train, Army Service Corps (146, 147, 148 and 149 Companies)
- 29th Mobile Veterinary Section, Army Veterinary Corps
- 218th Divisional Employment Company (joined 9 June 1917)
- 17th Divisional Motor Ambulance Workshop (absorbed into divisional train 2 April 1916)

== Commanders ==
- Major General Walter Kenyon-Slaney September 1914 — January 1915
- Major General Thomas Pilcher January 1915 — July 1916
- Major General Philip Robertson July 1916 — May 1919

== Victoria Cross recipients ==
- Sergeant Harold Colley, 10th (Service) Battalion, Lancashire Fusiliers
- Private Tom Dresser, 7th (Service) Battalion, Alexandra, Princess of Wales's Own (Yorkshire Regiment)
- Sergeant Harold Jackson, 7th (Service) Battalion, East Yorkshire Regiment
- Corporal Frank Lester, 10th (Service) Battalion, Lancashire Fusiliers

== See also ==
- List of British divisions in World War I
