= Ralph Champney Broome =

- Born: 29 January 1860; South Dum Dum, British India
- Died: 25 August 1915 (aged 55); Colombo, Ceylon
- Military career
- Allegiance: United Kingdom
- Branch: British Army (1878–1881); British Indian Army (1881–1915)
- Service years: 1878–1915
- Rank: Major-General
- Conflicts: First World War
- Awards: Companion of the Order of the Indian Empire

Major-General Ralph Champney Broome, CIE (29 January 1860 – 25 August 1915) was a British Indian Army officer.

Broome joined the British Army's 100th (Prince of Wales's Royal Canadian) Regiment of Foot in 1878 and transferred to the Indian Army in 1881.

Broome died in Colombo, Ceylon, on his way back to India after a visit to Australia concerning remount duties. At the time of his death, he had been director-general, Indian Army Remount Department since 1908.
