= Termination of the Present War (Definition) Act 1918 =

Act of the Parliament of the United Kingdom

Termination of the Present War (Definition) Act 1918 (Note: Section 2.)
- Act of Parliament
- Parliament of the United Kingdom
- Long title: An Act to make provision for determining the date of the termination of the present war, and for purposes connected therewith.
- Citation: 8 & 9 Geo. 5. c. 59
- Territorial extent: United Kingdom

Dates
- Royal assent: 21 November 1918
- Commencement: 21 November 1918 (Note: The Acts of Parliament (Commencement) Act 1793.)
- Repealed: 31 July 1978
Other legislation
Amended by	Statute Law (Repeals) Act 1971
Repealed by	Statute Law (Repeals) Act 1978

Status: Repealed

Text of statute as originally enacted

The Termination of the Present War (Definition) Act 1918 (8 & 9 Geo. 5. c. 59) was an act of the Parliament of the United Kingdom passed in 1918.

This act made provision and offered guidance as regards how the British Government would determine that the First World War had come to an end. Discretion was granted to His Majesty in Council to issue orders, which would legally determine the matter.

Thus the war between the British Empire and the following states ended with respect to:

- Germany on 10 January 1920
- Austria on 16 July 1920
- Bulgaria on 9 August 1920
- Hungary on 26 July 1921
- Turkey on 6 August 1924

For all other purposes, the war was declared to have ended on 31 August 1921.

== Text ==
1. (1) His Majesty in Council may declare what date is to be treated as the date of the termination of the present war, and the present war shall be treated as having continued to, and as having ended on that date for the purposes of any provision in any Act of Parliament, Order in Council, or Proclamation, and, except where the context otherwise requires, of any provision in any contract, deed, or other instrument referring, expressly or impliedly, and in whatever form of words, to the present war or the present hostilities.

Provided that in the case of any such Act conferring powers on any Government Department, or any officer of any Government Department, exerciseable during the continuance of the present war, if it appears to His Majesty that it is expedient that the powers shall cease before the date so fixed as aforesaid, His Majesty in Council may fix some earlier date for the termination of those powers.

(2) The date so declared shall be as nearly as may be the date of the exchange or deposit of ratifications of the treaty or treaties of peace:

Provided that, notwithstanding anything in this provision, the date declared as aforesaid shall be conclusive for all purposes of this Act.

(3) His Majesty in Council may also similarly declare what date is to be treated as the date of the termination of war between His Majesty and any particular State.

2. This Act may be cited as the Termination of the Present War (Definition) Act, 1918.

== Use ==
Many soldiers had enlisted on a "short service" basis as introduced by Kitchener. This meant they had signed up for three years or the "duration of the war", which ever was the longer. This act had an impact as regards how the "duration of the war" was understood. Thus the Termination of the Present War (Definition) Act 1918 was quoted by the War Office in conjunction with the Army of India on 9 May 1919, following the start of the third Anglo-Afghan War. This document explained the armistice of November 1918 was merely a suspension of hostilities. This meant that the Territorials serving in India would be required to remain there until the war itself had ended. This led to enquiries from a number of units as regards whether the new war with Afghanistan would be a factor in continuing the war. This was a particular concern to the lorry drivers of the Royal Army Service Corps, 600 of whom promptly went on strike in Karachi, and refused to entrain for departure to the North West Frontier. Brigadier General William Anderson at first proposed to imprison the strikers and send them back to Great Britain.

Among the actions scheduled for the end of the war were the disestablishment of the Church of England in Wales under the Welsh Church Act 1914 (4 & 5 Geo. 5. c. 91) and the introduction of Irish Home Rule under the Government of Ireland Act 1914 (4 & 5 Geo. 5. c. 90). The Suspensory Act 1914 (c. 88) postponed the relevant parts of the two acts until the end of the war, whose imminence later gave urgency to the passing of the Welsh Church (Temporalities) Act 1919 (9 & 10 Geo. 5. c. 65) and Government of Ireland Act 1920 (10 & 11 Geo. 5. c. 67), which respectively amended and superseded their 1914 equivalents.

== Subsequent developments ==
Section 1(2) of the act was repealed by section 1 of, and the part V of the schedule to, the Statute Law (Repeals) Act 1971, which came into force on 27 July 1971.

The whole act was repealed by section 1(1) of, and part XVII of schedule 1 to, the Statute Law (Repeals) Act 1978, which came into force on 31 July 1978.
