= Cecil Wray =

Cecil Wray may refer to:

- Cecil Wray (administrator), British resident at Pahang after Hugh Clifford
- Sir Cecil Wray, 11th Baronet (c.1678–1736), High Sheriff of Lincolnshire, 1715
- Sir Cecil Wray, 13th Baronet (1734–1805), British politician
- Cecil J. Wray (1867–1955), New Zealand sports administrator
