= 1919 Birthday Honours (New Zealand) =

Awards list for New Zealand

The 1919 King's Birthday Honours in New Zealand, celebrating the official birthday of King George V, were appointments made by the King on the recommendation of the New Zealand government to various orders and honours to reward and highlight good works by New Zealanders. They were announced on or dated 3 June 1919.

The recipients of honours are displayed here as they were styled before their new honour.

== Knight Bachelor ==
- George Fenwick JP – of Dunedin; founder and for over 30 years director of the New Zealand Press Association. For public services.
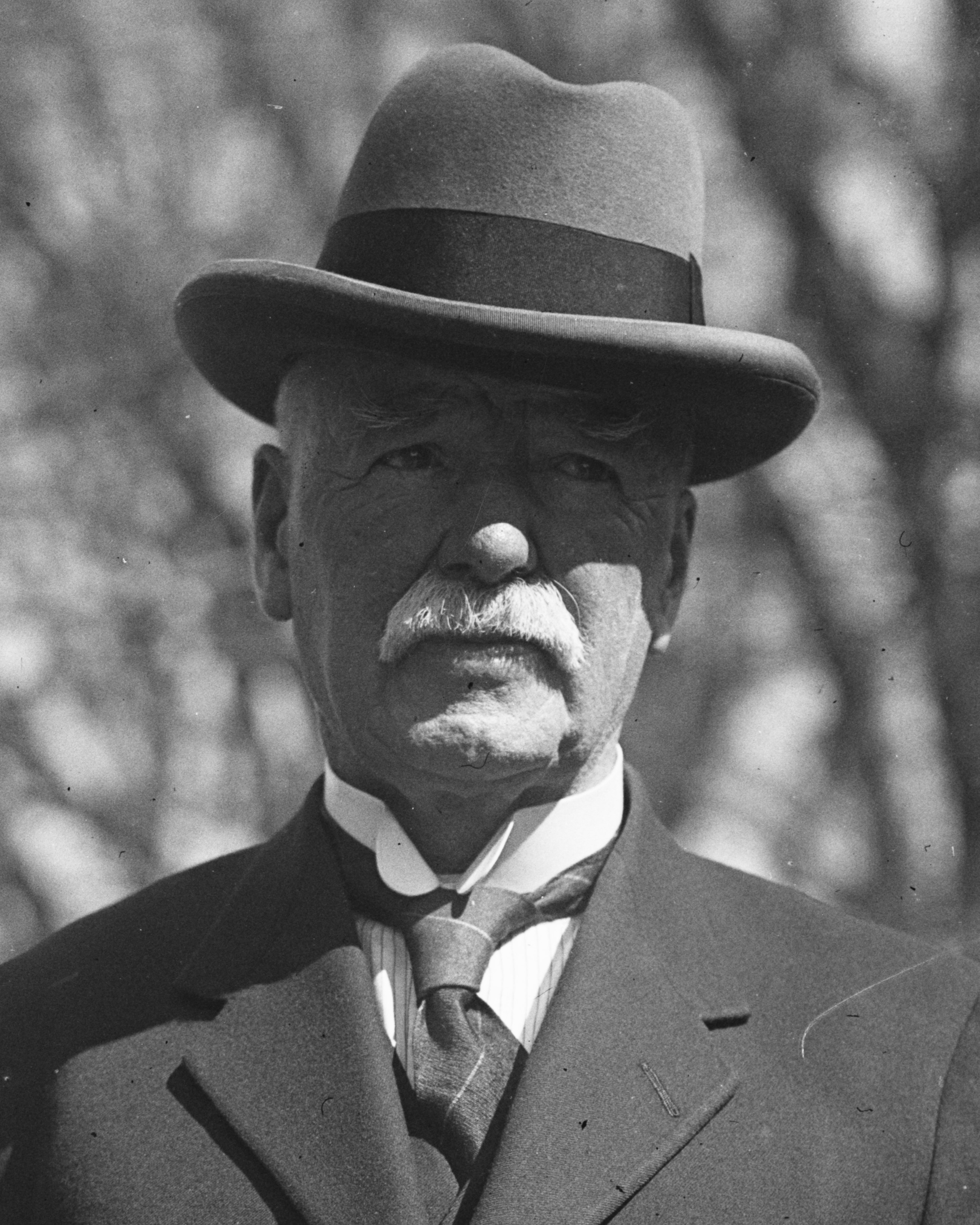
Sir George Fenwick

== Order of the Bath ==
=== Companion (CB) ===
Military division, additional

- Lieutenant-Colonel (Temporary Brigadier-General) Herbert Ernest Hart CMG DSO – Wellington Regiment.
- Lieutenant-Colonel (Temporary Brigadier-General) William Meldrum CMG DSO – New Zealand Mounted Rifles Brigade.
- Lieutenant-Colonel (Temporary Brigadier-General) Charles William Melvill CMG DSO – New Zealand Rifle Brigade.
- Lieutenant-Colonel (Temporary Brigadier-General) Robert Young CMG DSO – Canterbury Regiment
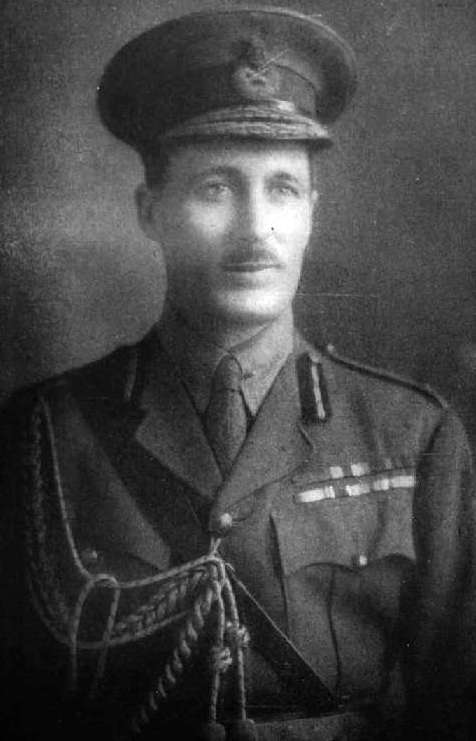
Herbert Hart

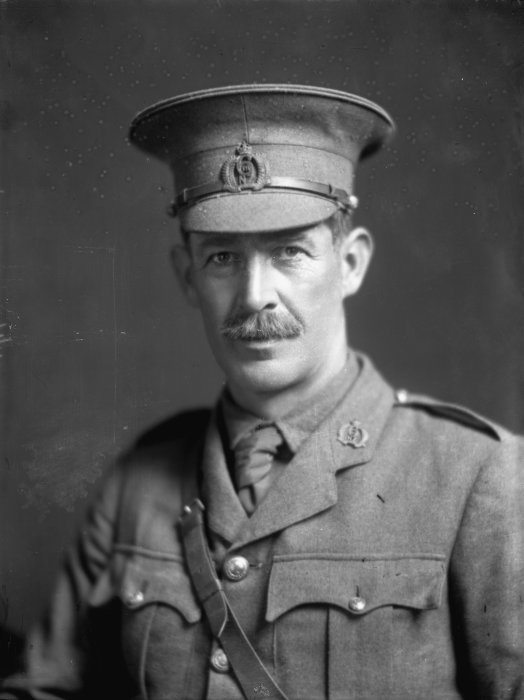
William Meldrum

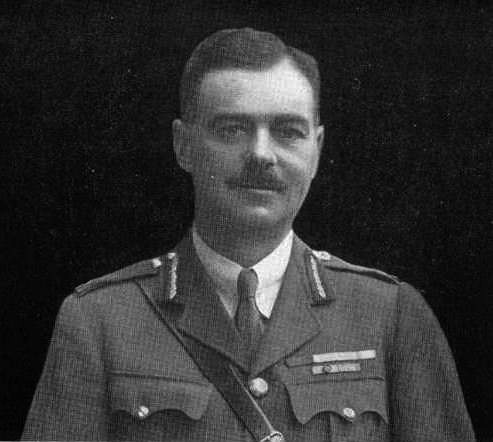
Charles Melvill

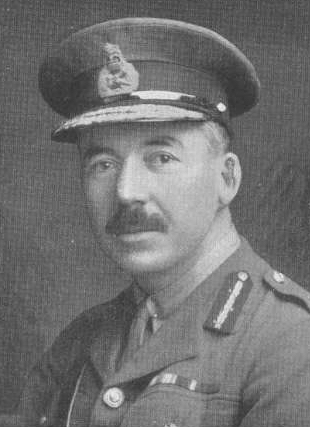
Robert Young

== Order of Saint Michael and Saint George ==
=== Companion (CMG) ===
Additional

- Lieutenant-Colonel Stephen Shepherd Allen DSO – 2nd Battalion, Auckland Regiment.
- Lieutenant-Colonel Henry Esau Avery DSO – New Zealand Staff Corps.
- Lieutenant-Colonel George Cruickshanks Griffths – Canterbury Regiment.
- Lieutenant-Colonel James Neill McCarroll DSO – Auckland Mounted Rifles Regiment.
- Lieutenant-Colonel (Temporary Colonel) Hugh Stewart DSO MC – Canterbury Regiment.
- Lieutenant-Colonel (Temporary Brigadier-General) Alexander Edward Stewart DSO – New Zealand Rifle Brigade.
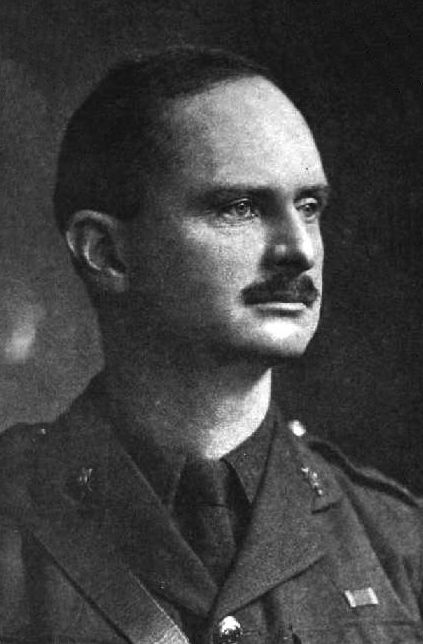
Stephen Allen

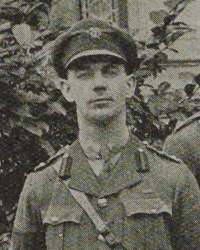
Henry Avery

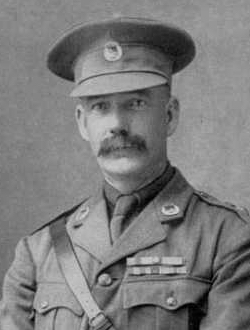
James McCarroll

== Order of the British Empire ==
=== Commander (CBE) ===
Civil division

- Ethel Mary Burnett – of Wellington. For services in connection with the New Zealand War Contingent Association, London.
- James John Clark OBE – ex-mayor of Dunedin. For services in connection with patriotic undertakings.
- Albert Cecil Day – Official Secretary to the Governor-General. For services to the New Zealand Government during the war.
- James Henry Gunson OBE – mayor of Auckland. For services in connection with patriotic undertakings.
- Henry Holland OBE – ex-mayor of Christchurch. For services in connection with patriotic undertakings.
- Ranald Macintosh Macdonald. (Note: This person is listed in the London Gazette as Ronald Macintosh MacDonald; the spelling shown here is per his correct name.) For services in connection with the New Zealand War Contingent Association, London.
- William Hugh Montgomery – of Wellington. For services as assistant director of base records.
- Iris Brenda Rolleston MBE – of Lowry Bay. For services in organising the Taumaru Hospital (Lowry Bay) for Wounded and Convalescent Soldiers, and for voluntary services as matron.

Military division

- Lieutenant-Colonel Hugh Thomas Dyke Acland CMG FRCS – New Zealand Medical Corps.
- Lieutenant-Colonel Anderson Robert Dillon Carberry FRCS – New Zealand Medical Corps.
- Lieutenant-Colonel D'Arcy Chaytor CMG – Canterbury Mounted Rifles Regiment
- Colonel James McNaughton Christie.
- Colonel Percival Robert Cooke.
- Colonel Charles James Cooper TD.
- Major and Temporary Lieutenant-Colonel Thomas Henry Dawson CMG – Auckland Regiment.
- Lieutenant-Colonel Alexander Robertson Falconer – New Zealand Medical Corps.
- Lieutenant-Colonel Norman FitzHerbert CMG – Wellington Regiment.
- Lieutenant-Colonel George Edward Gabites – New Zealand Medical Corps.
- Lieutenant-Colonel George Thompson Hall CMG.
- Colonel Ernest Haviland Hiley.
- Lieutenant-Colonel George Home OBE – New Zealand Medical Corps.
- Colonel John Edward Hume.
- Lieutenant-Colonel and Temporary Colonel James William Hutchen CMG.
- Lieutenant-Colonel John Patrick Daunt Leahy – New Zealand Medical Corps.
- Lieutenant-Colonel (Temporary Colonel) Charles Ernest Randolph Mackesy CMG – Auckland Mounted Rifles Regiment.
- Colonel Charles Thomas Major DSO.
- Lieutenant-Colonel Robert Haldane Makgill – New Zealand Medical Corps.
- Major Thomas McKibbon OBE – New Zealand Medical Corps.
- Temporary Colonel Thomas Mill CMG – New Zealand Medical Corps.
- Lieutenant-Colonel Herbert Edward Pilkington – New Zealand Artillery.
- Colonel David Pringle TD.
- Colonel James Robert Purdy VD.
- Colonel Charles John Reakes – New Zealand Veterinary Corps.
- Colonel John Ranken Reed KC.
- Colonel The Honourable Robert Heaton Rhodes MP – New Zealand Territorial Force.
- Lieutenant-Colonel Alexander Fowler Roberts OBE – New Zealand Military Forces.
- Lieutenant-Colonel James Herbert Graham Robertson – New Zealand Medical Corps.
- Lieutenant-Colonel James Lewis Sleeman – New Zealand Military Forces.
- Colonel Edmund Robinson Smith VD.
- Colonel William James Strong TD.
- Major and Temporary Lieutenant-Colonel John Studholme DSO – Canterbury Mounted Rifles Regiment.
- Mabel Thurston RRC – matron-in-chief, New Zealand Army Nursing Service.
- Colonel Russell Tracy-Inglis – New Zealand Medical Corps.
- Colonel Thomas Harcourt Ambrose Valintine – New Zealand Medical Corps.
- Lieutenant-Colonel Robert Henry Walton MD FRCS – New Zealand Medical Corps.
- Colonel Gerard Arnold Ward.
- Major (Temporary Lieutenant-Colonel) James Taylor Watson OBE – Auckland Regiment.
- Colonel David Storer Wylie CMG – New Zealand Medical Corps.
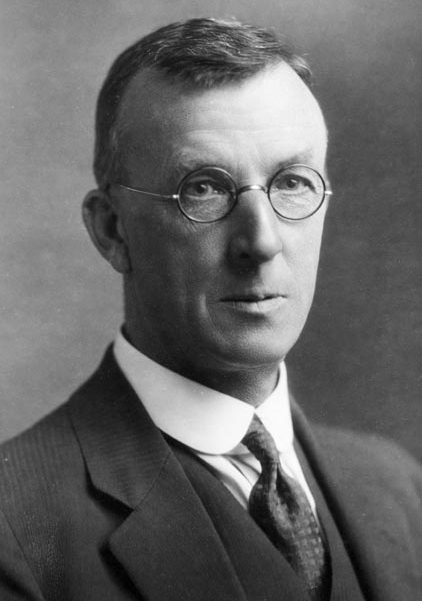
Hugh Acland

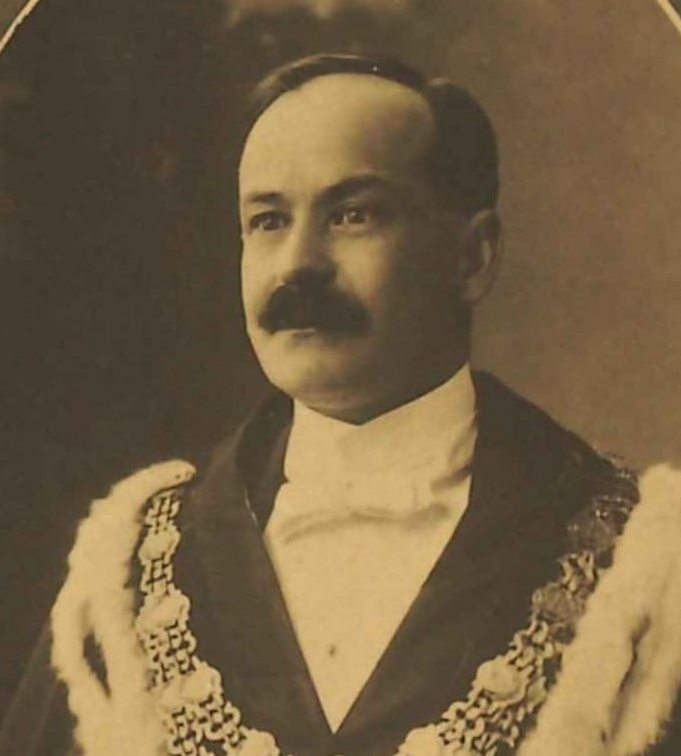
James Clark

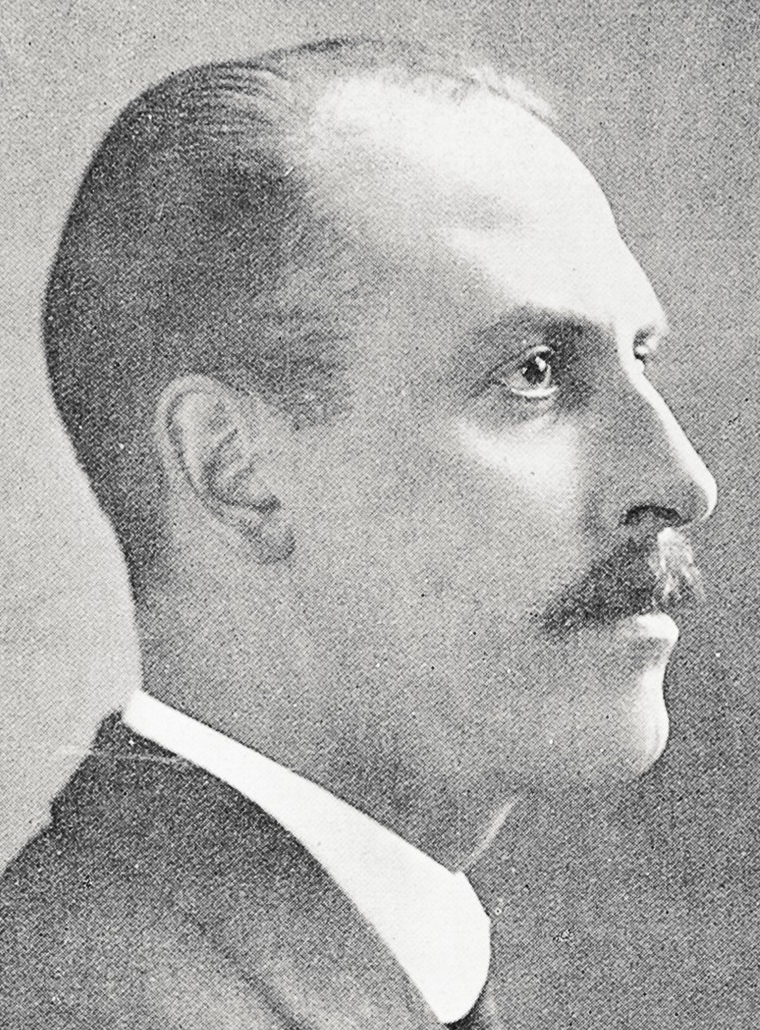
Cecil Day

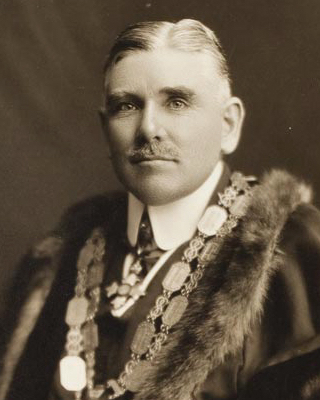
James Gunson

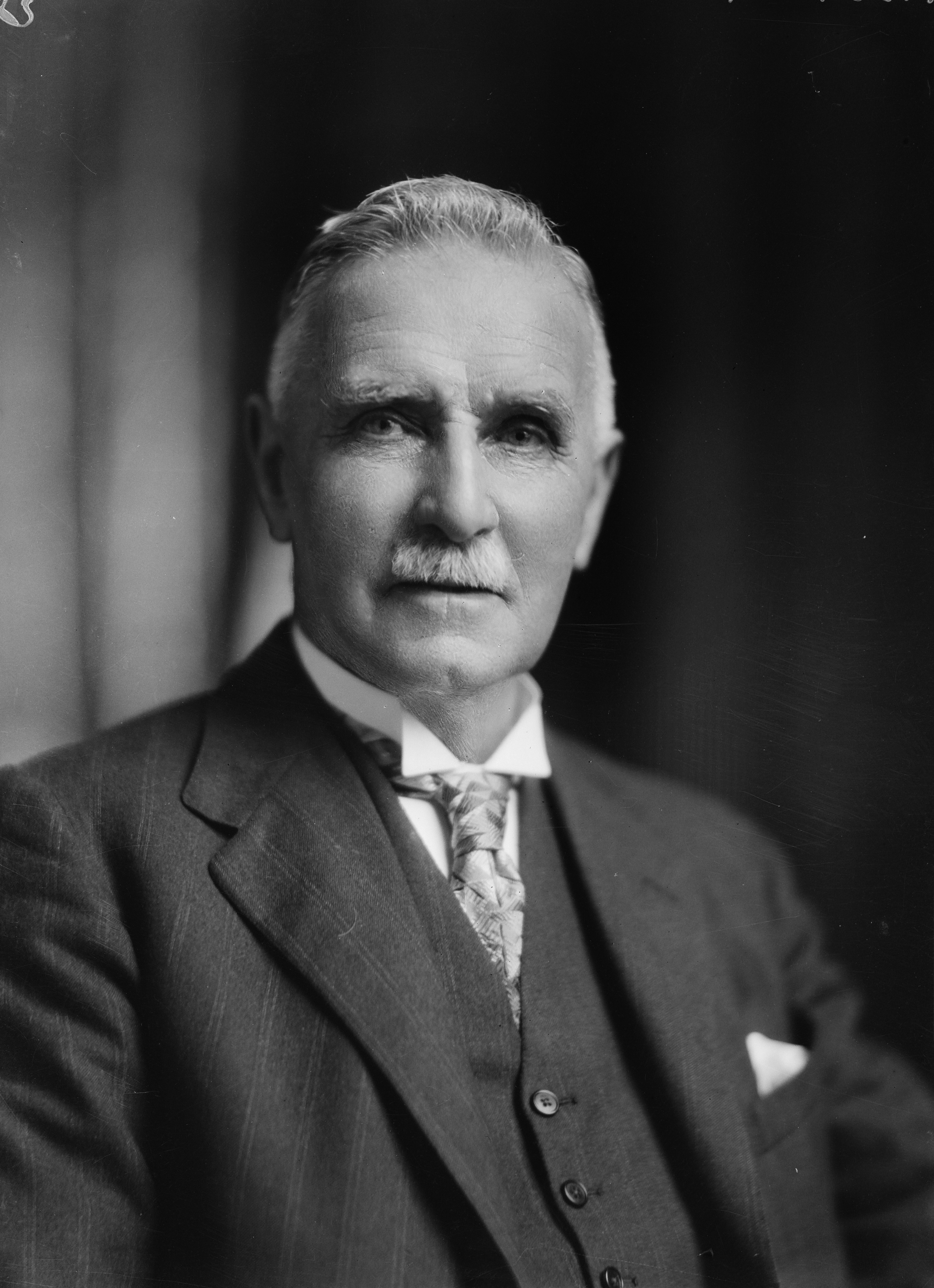
Henry Holland

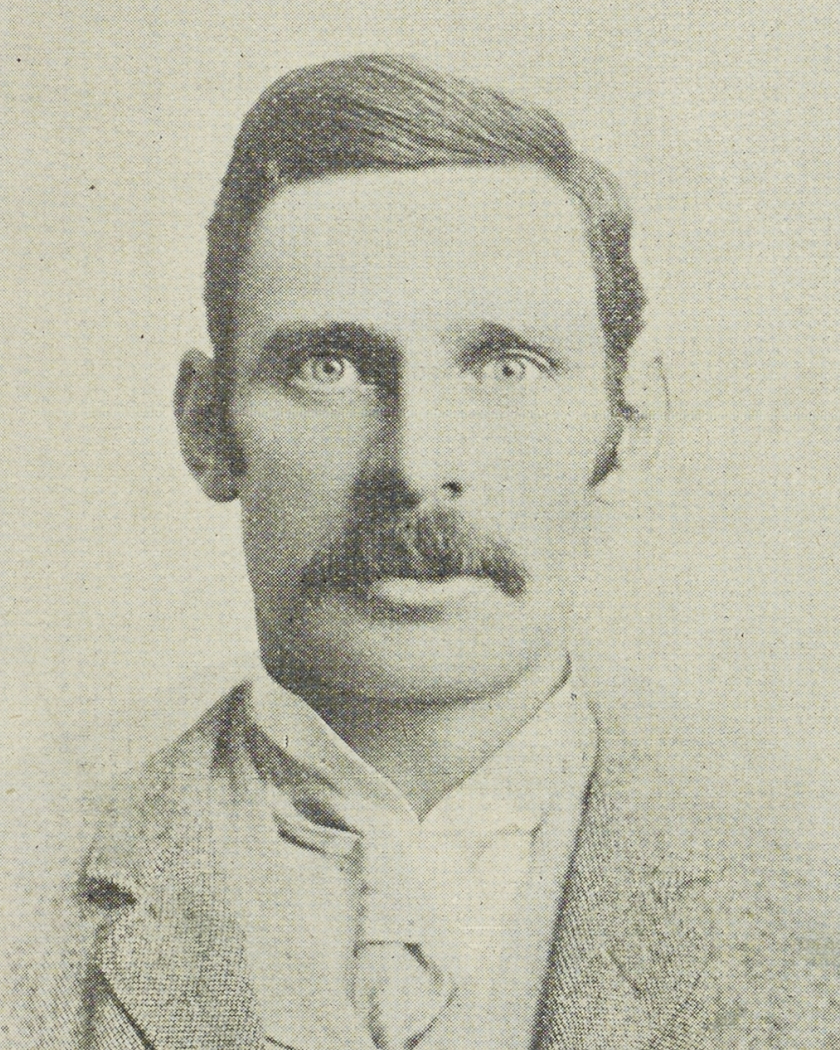
William Montgomery

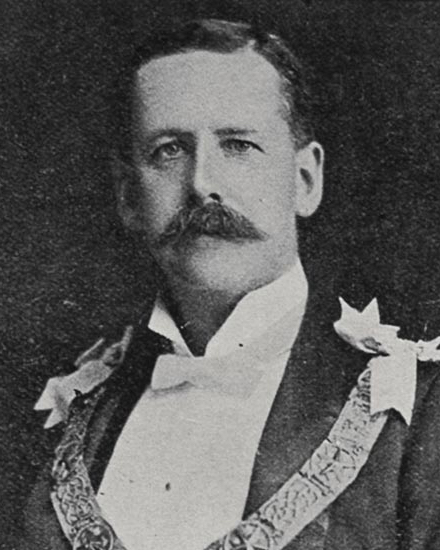
John Reed

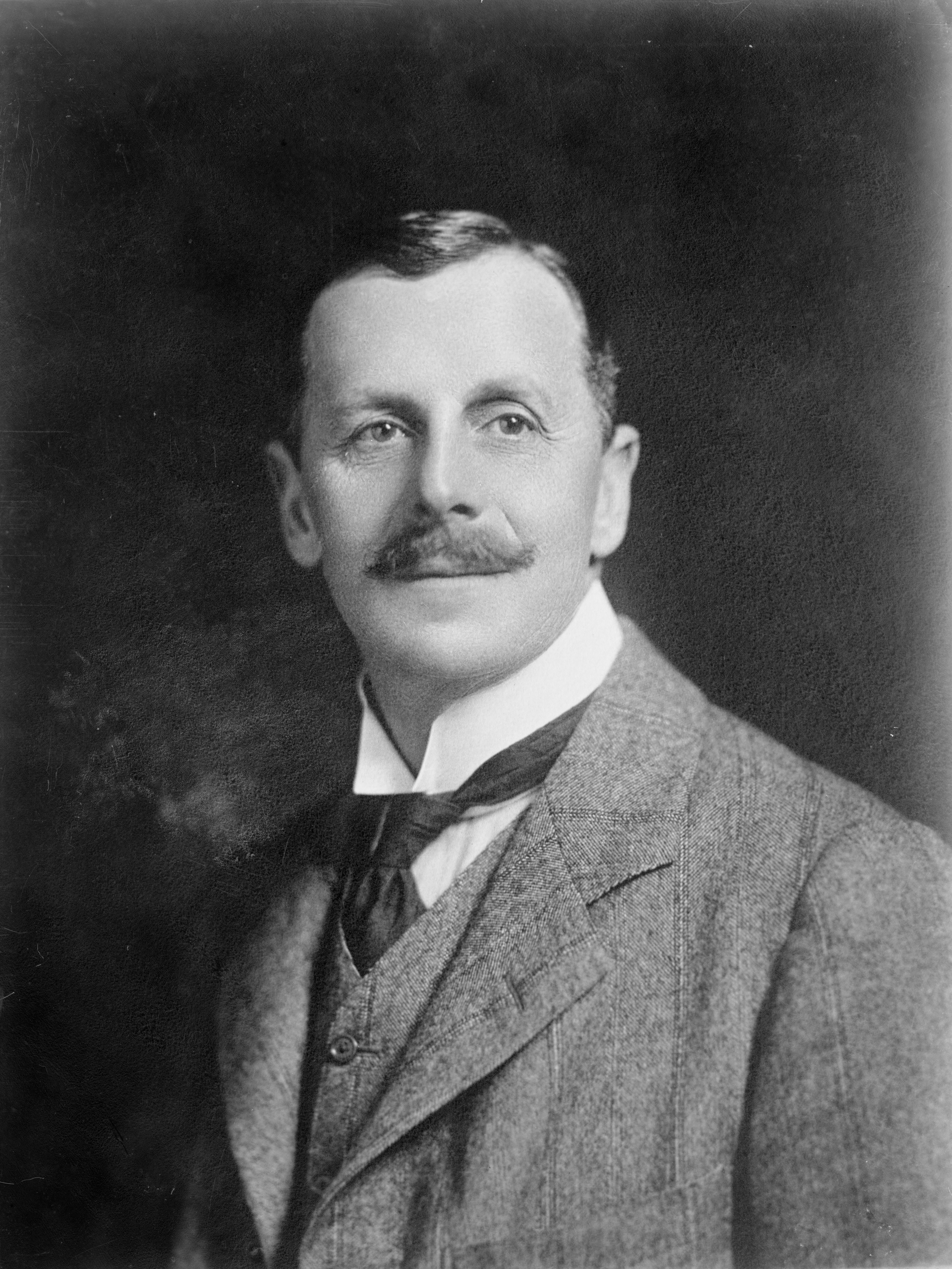
Heaton Rhodes

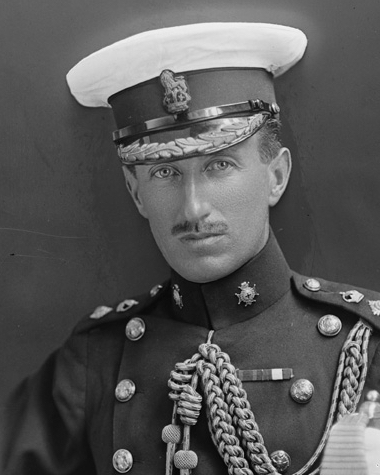
James Sleeman

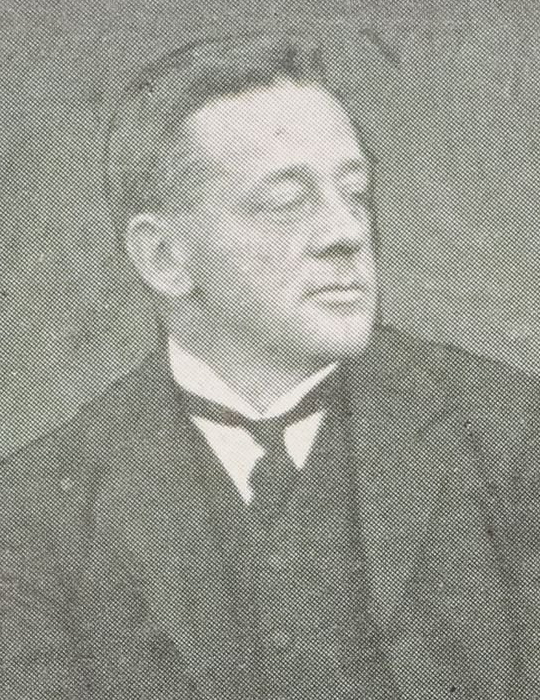
Thomas Valintine

=== Officer (OBE) ===
Civil division

- Thomas Noel Brodrick – of Wellington. For services as under-secretary of the Lands and Survey Department.
- Frederick James Burgess – stipendiary magistrate; of Auckland. For services as a member of a military service board.
- James Burnett – of Wellington.
- Donald George Clark – of Wellington. For services as commissioner of the Land and Income Tax Department.
- The Right Reverend Henry William Cleary DD – Roman Catholic Bishop of Auckland. For services as chaplain to the New Zealand Expeditionary Force.
- Daniel George Arthur Cooper – stipendiary magistrate; of Wellington. For services as a member of a military service board.
- Victor Grace Day – stipendiary magistrate; of Timaru. For services as a member of a military service board.
- Frederick Earl KC – stipendiary magistrate; of Auckland. For services as a member of a military service board.
- James Sim Evans – stipendiary magistrate; of Nelson. For services in connection with a military service board.
- George Cox Fache – commissioner of pensions; of Wellington. For services in connection with war pensions.
- Frederick Chandos Courtenay Fell – of Nikau Bay, Pelorus Sound / Te Hoiere. For services in connection with patriotic organisations.
- James Findlay – of Wellington. For services as chairman of the Overseas Shipowners' Committee, Wellington.
- Malcolm Fraser – of Wellington. For services as government statistician.
- James Hislop – of Wellington. For services as under-secretary of the Department of Internal Affairs, the department in charge of war funds.
- William Barr Montgomery – of Wellington. For services as comptroller of customs.
- Thomas Moss – of Eketāhuna. For services as a member of the National Efficiency Board.
- Vera Anita Myers – of Wellington. For services as head of the voluntary staff at the Base Records Office.
- John William Poynton – stipendiary magistrate; of Palmerston North. For services in connection with a military service board.
- George Edward Rhodes – of Christchurch. For services in connection with the New Zealand branch of the British Red Cross Society and Order of St John of Jerusalem.
- Thomas Sheriff Ronaldson – assistant public trustee; of Wellington. For service as chairman of the Financial Assistance Board.
- The Reverend William Shirer – of Wellington; senior Presbyterian chaplain to the New Zealand Military Forces.
- Guy Hardy Scholefield – of London.
- George Shirtcliffe – of Wellington. For services in connection with the New Zealand branch of the British Red Cross Society and Order of St John of Jerusalem.
- The Right Reverend Thomas Henry Sprott DD – Anglican Bishop of Wellington. For services in connection with the selection and allocation of chaplains to the New Zealand Expeditionary Force.
- Kīngi Tōpia – of Taihape; high chief of the Whanganui and Tūwharetoa tribes. For services in connection with recruiting and in securing land for returned Māori soldiers.
- Thomas Wilson – of Wellington. For services in connection with the Financial Assistance Board.

Military division

- Major Leopold George Dyke Acland MC – New Zealand Army Service Corps.
- Lieutenant-Colonel Philip Oswald Andrew – New Zealand Medical Corps.
- Major Charles Eric Andrews – New Zealand Staff Corps.
- Captain Gilbert Edward Archey – New Zealand Field Artillery.
- Major Cyril Victor Baigent MB – New Zealand Medical Corps.
- Major George Bertram Banks – New Zealand Staff Corps,
- Lieutenant-Colonel George Barclay VD – New Zealand Engineers.
- Captain Eric Hamilton Beamish – Wellington Mounted Rifles Regiment.
- Lieutenant-Colonel Henry Ferdinand Bernau – New Zealand Medical Corps.
- Major Samuel James Bolton – New Zealand Army Pay Corps.
- Major Frederick Thompson Bowerbank MD – New Zealand Medical Corps.
- Captain (Temporary Major) John Falconer Brown MD – New Zealand Medical Corps.
- Major (Temporary Lieutenant-Colonel) Henry Meredith Buchanan MB – New Zealand Medical Corps.
- Major Edmund Harry Colbeck MD – New Zealand Medical Corps.
- Captain Leofric Pearson Davies – New Zealand Dental Corps.
- Major Peter Maxwell Edgar – New Zealand Veterinary Corps.
- Captain David Eardley Fenwick MD – New Zealand Medical Corps.
- Major George Ernest Oswald Fenwick FRCS – New Zealand Medical Corps.
- Captain Charles Ingram Gossage – New Zealand Army Ordnance Corps.
- Captain Reginald Ronald Gow – Otago Regiment.
- Major Charles Ernest Hercus DSO.
- Lieutenant-Colonel Alexander Wilson Hogg – New Zealand Medical Corps.
- Captain Gordon Hovey – Auckland Mounted Rifles Regiment.
- Major George Rowland Hutchinson – New Zealand Army Service Corps.
- Major Arnold Woodford Izard MD – New Zealand Medical Corps.
- The Reverend Archdeacon John Attwood Jacob – New Zealand Chaplains' Department.
- Major William Kay – New Zealand Rifle Brigade.
- Major Thomas Lawless – New Zealand Army Pay Corps.
- Major Norman Joseph Levien MBE – New Zealand Army Ordnance Corps.
- Lieutenant-Colonel William Little – New Zealand Medical Corps.
- Major Eric Lachlan Marchant – New Zealand Medical Corps.
- Major Thomas McChristell – New Zealand Army Ordnance Corps.
- Major David McCurdy – Otago Mounted Rifles Regiment.
- Major Donald Archibald McCurdy MBE.
- Major Charles Edward May – New Zealand Army Service Corps.
- Captain (Temporary Major) James Edward Hedley Mewett MC – Auckland Regiment.
- Major John Mounsey – New Zealand Military Forces.
- Captain Allan Stanley Muir – of Wellington.
- Major Neville Newcomb – New Zealand Military Forces.
- Captain (Temporary Major) Harry Oram – Wellington Infantry Regiment.
- Major Francis Edward Ostler – New Zealand Army Service Corps.
- Major Henry Peacock – New Zealand Staff Corps.
- Major Henry Percy Pickerill – New Zealand Medical Corps.
- Major Harold Avery Reid – New Zealand Veterinary Corps.
- Major Thomas Duncan McGregor Stout DSO – New Zealand Medical Corps.
- Captain (Temporary Major) Kenneth Edwin Tapper MB – New Zealand Medical Corps.
- Captain Charles Archibald Lawrance Treadwell – Wellington Infantry Regiment.
- Major William Henry Turnbuli – New Zealand Army Service Corps.
- Major Francis Parnell Tymons – New Zealand Dental Corps.
- Major Hugh Vickerman DSO – New Zealand Railway Engineers.
- Captain Herbert Horatio Spencer Westmacott – Auckland Regiment.
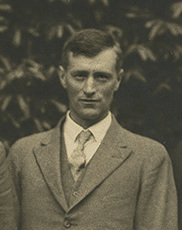
Gilbert Archey

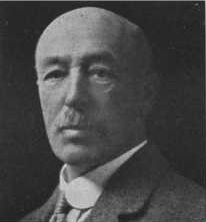
Noel Brodrick

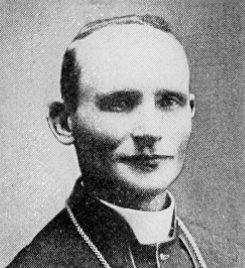
Henry Cleary

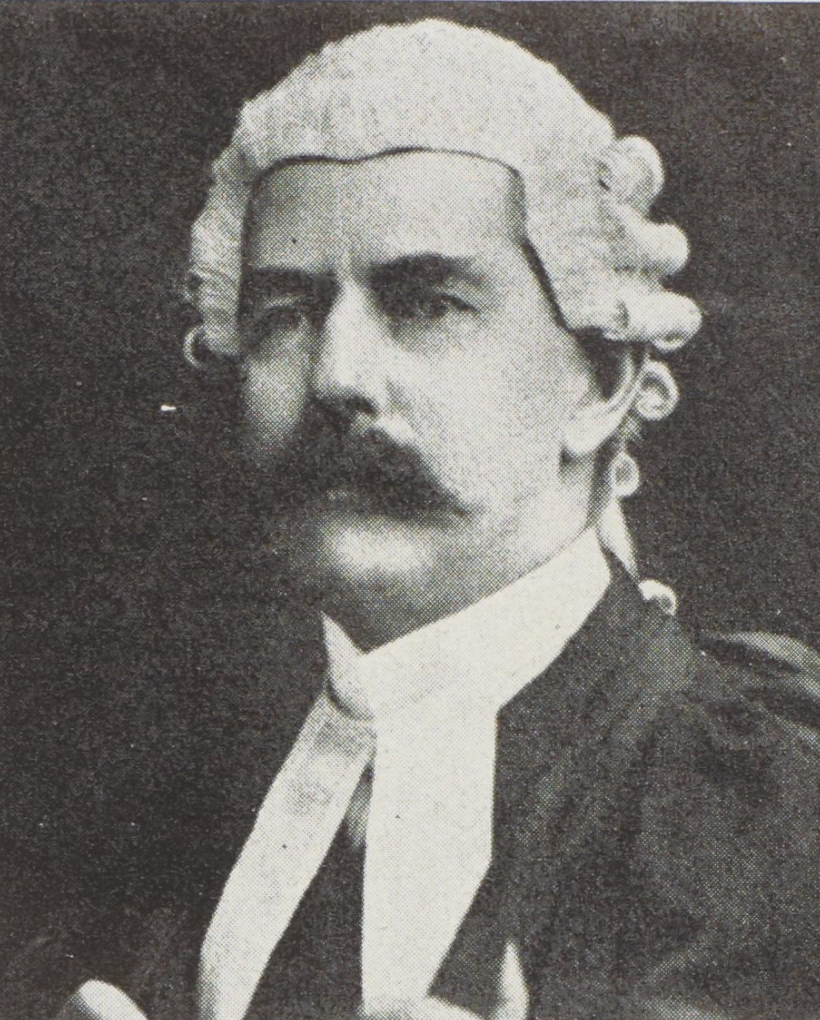
Fred Earl

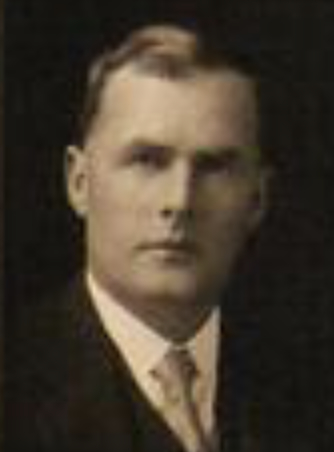
Charles Hercus

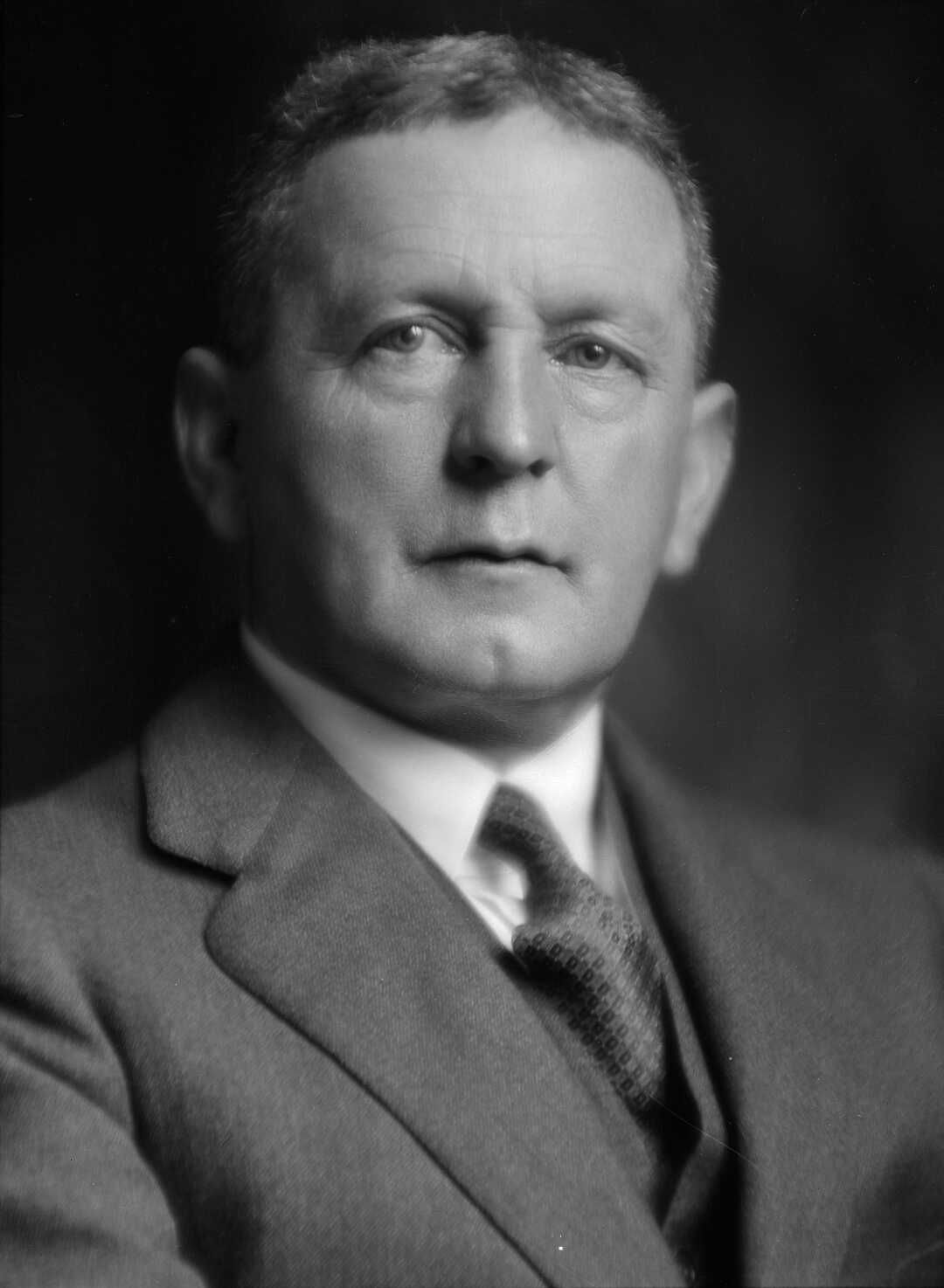
Guy Scholefield

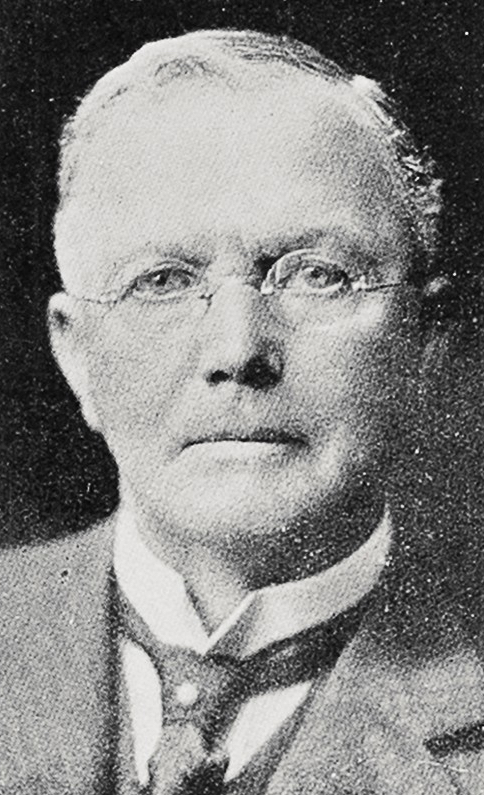
George Shirtcliffe

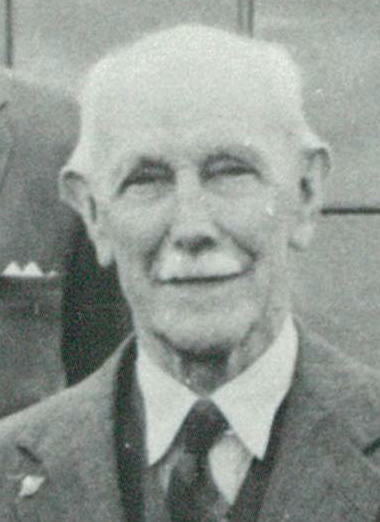
Duncan Stout

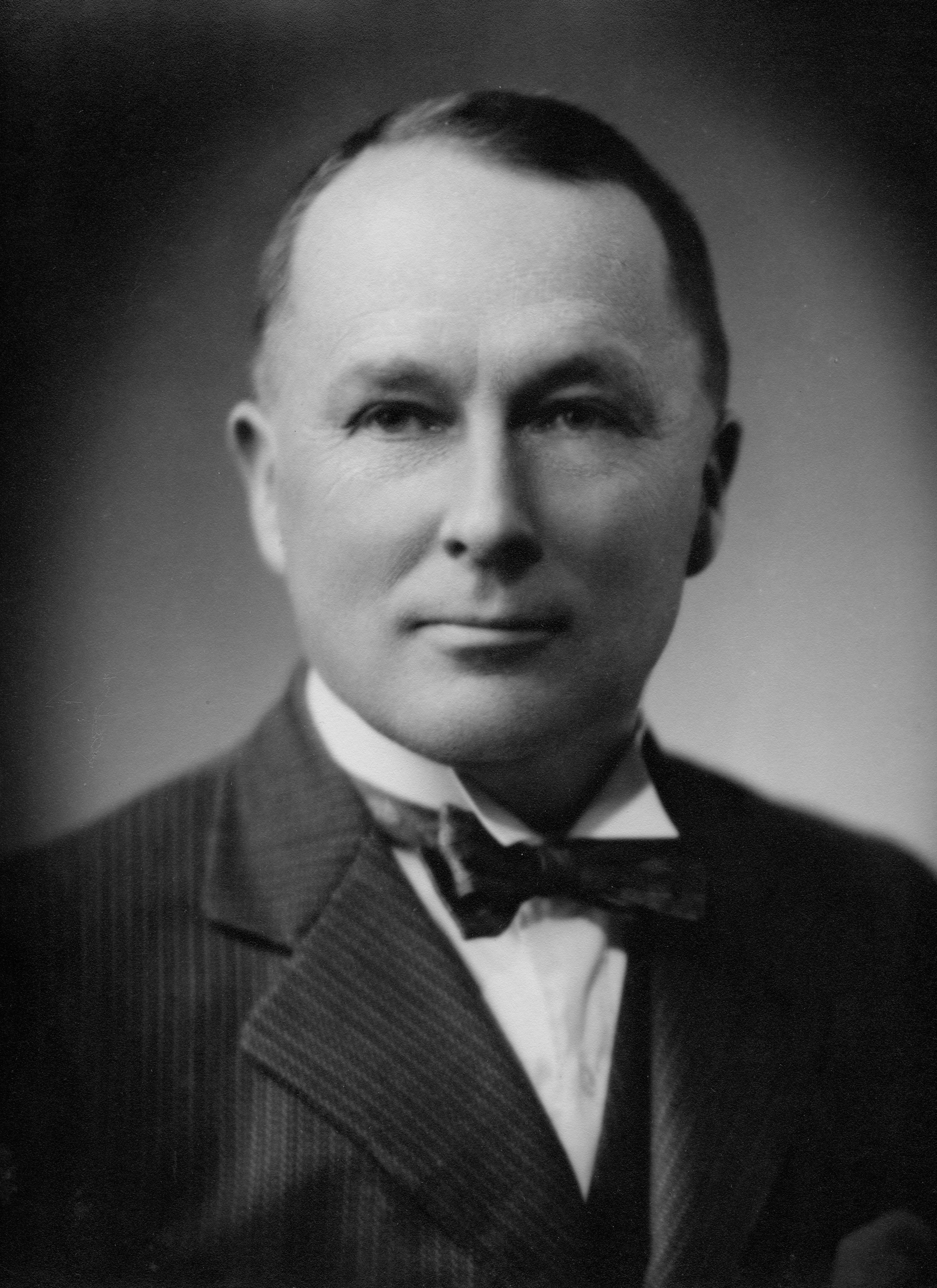
Charles Treadwell

=== Member (MBE) ===
Civil division

- Alfred Montague Adams – of Wellington. For services as chief executive officer of the Munitions and Supplies Department.
- Rachel Mary Barton – of Hāwera. For services in connection with patriotic organisations.
- Margaret Brown Blackwell – of Kaiapoi. For services in connection with the Countess of Liverpool Fund for the New Zealand Expeditionary Force.
- Hilda Bloomfield – of Auckland. For services in connection with the New Zealand branch of the British Red Cross Society and the Order of St John of Jerusalem and for the Victoria League.
- Annie Elizabeth Blundell – of Wellington. For services in connection with the New Zealand branch of the British Red Cross Society and Order of St John of Jerusalem.
- Janet Bowie – of Milton. For Red Cross services.
- Violet McConochie Brown – of Napier. For services in connection with soldiers' equipment.
- Charles Hayward Burgess – mayor of New Plymouth. For patriotic services.
- Alexander Burt Jr. – of Auckland. For services in connection with the Motor Boat Section of the New Zealand Defence Forces.
- Edith de Castro – of Wellington. For services in institutions at Cairo and in canteen at Ismailia, Egypt.
- Esther Charles – of Auckland. For patriotic services.
- Lydia Clark – of Wellington. For services in connection with the Countess of Liverpool Fund for the New Zealand Expeditionary Force.
- Ethel Mary Cooper – of Wellington. For services in connection with the New Zealand branch of the British Red Cross Society and the Order of St John.
- Frances Zoe Courage – of Amberley. For services in connection with the New Zealand Branch of the British Red Cross Society and the Order of St John of Jerusalem.
- Gertrude Alice Crawford – of Nelson. For services in connection with the Countess of Liverpool Fund for the New Zealand Expeditionary Force.
- Ethel Cuff – of Te Aroha. For services in connection with the New Zealand branch of the British Red Cross Society and the Order of St John of Jerusalem.
- Hannah Dawson – of Auckland. For patriotic services.
- George Finley Dixon – of Wellington. For services as private secretary to the Minister of Defence.
- Mabel Makua-i-te-rangi Hapuku Ellison – of Ōpapa. For service in connection with the New Zealand branch of the British Red Cross Society and the Order of St John of Jerusalem.
- Harold Gerard – of Samoa. For services as assistant private secretary to the Minister of Defence.
- Louisa Grace Charlotte Greenslade – of Hamilton. For patriotic services.
- Thomas Gunnion – of Temuka. For patriotic services.
- Agnes Brenda Boyd Guthrie – of Christchurch. For services as a voluntary worker at the Victoria Military Ward of the Wellington Hospital.
- Eveline Alice Marian Harcourt – of Wellington. For services on the voluntary staff at Base Records Office.
- Kate Clara Harrison – of Whangārei. For patriotic services.
- Henry William Harrington – of Wellington. For services as censor.
- Heathcote George Helmore – of Christchurch. For services as aide-de-camp to the governor-general.
- Emma Carey Hill – of Christchurch. For services in connection with the Victoria League.
- Margaret Mary Annie Hislop – of Geraldine. For services in connection with the Countess of Liverpool Fund.
- Ann Margaret Hitchon – of Milton. For services in connection with Belgian relief and the entertainment of New Zealand soldiers.
- Elizabeth Annie Holdsworth – of Wellington. For services on the voluntary staff at Base Records Office.
- William Godfrey Holdsworth – of Wellington. For services on the voluntary staff at Base Records Office.
- Lavinia Jane Kelsey – of Dunedin. For patriotic services.
- Emma Ethel Maud Ford King – of Napier. For patriotic services.
- Sarah Hannah King – of Milton. For patriotic services.
- James Benjamin Lovell – of Havelock. For services in connection with patriotic funds.
- Ethel Constance Chapman Macassey – of Dunedin. For patriotic services.
- Mina MacDonald. For services at the Aotea Home, Heliopolis, Cairo, Egypt.
- Mysie McDonnell. For services at the Aotea Home, Heliopolis, Cairo, Egypt.
- Agnes Maxwell McDougall – of Bluff. For services in connection with patriotic undertakings.
- Pura McGregor – of Putiki. For services in connection with the Maori Expeditionary Force.
- Nesta Gertrude Maling – of Timaru. For services in connection with the Countess of Liverpool Fund for the New Zealand Expeditionary Force.
- Basil Arthur Marris – of Wellington. For services as chief clerk, Base Records Office.
- Alfred Andrew Martin – of Auckland. For services in organising supply of motor vehicles at Auckland for returning soldiers.
- Lieutenant Frederick Gwilliam Matthews – of Wellington For services as private secretary to the Minister of Defence.
- James Dothie Millton – of Christchurch. For services in connection with the Citizens' Defence Corps.
- Winnifred Moeller – of Napier. For patriotic services.
- Janet Elizabeth Murray – of Auckland. For services in connection with the New Zealand branch of the British Red Cross Society and the Order of St John of Jerusalem.
- Leo Francis O'Neill – of Wellington. For services in the Chief of the General Staff's branch of the Defence Department.
- Jessie Ellen Page – of Masterton. For services in supplying comforts to the soldiers at Featherston Military Training Camp.
- Lucy Philson – of Auckland. For patriotic services.
- Mary Ann Potter – of Milton. For services in connection with the Red Cross and the Countess of Liverpool Fund.
- George Charles Rodda – of Wellington. For services as officer in charge of war expenses branch of the Defence Department.
- William Archibald Russell – of Dunedin. For services in connection with patriotic undertakings.
- George Herbert Scales – of Lower Hutt. For services in shipping matters, and other patriotic work.
- Annie Wilhelmina Smart – of Napier. For services in connection with patriotic undertakings.
- Lilly Mary Smith – of Christchurch. For services in connection with the New Zealand branch of the British Red Cross Society and the Order of St John of Jerusalem.
- Martha Tahumu Spencer – of Bluff. For services in connection with the Maori Expeditionary Force.
- Florence Johanna Stevenson – of Christchurch. For work for the New Zealand branch of the British Red Cross Society and the Order of St John of Jerusalem.
- Bernard Edward Howard Tripp – of Timaru. For work for the New Zealand branch of the British Red Cross Society and the Order of St John of Jerusalem.
- Charles James Tunks – of Auckland. For services to the St John Ambulance Association.
- James Alfred Wallace – mayor of Motueka. For Red Cross and other patriotic services.
- Evelyn Elaine Lydia Ward – of Wellington. For services on the voluntary staff at Base Records Office.
- Charles White – of Blenheim. For services in connection with patriotic funds.
- Cecil James Wray – of London. For services in connection with prisoners of war and the comfort of New Zealand troops in hospitals in the United Kingdom.
- Elten Wray – of London. For services in connection with New Zealand prisoners of war.
- Fanny Ross Young – of Edinburgh. For services in connection with the New Zealand War Contingent Association, London.

Military division

- Captain William Atwell – New Zealand Staff Corps.
- 2nd Lieutenant Norman Bell – New Zealand Army Service Corps.
- Captain Charles Henry Booth – Auckland Regiment.
- Major John Thomas Bosworth – New Zealand Staff Corps.
- Captain Arthur William Brocks.
- Major Henry Harwood Brown – New Zealand Staff Corps.
- 2nd Lieutenant Cyril Blake Burdekin – Wellington Regiment.
- 2nd Lieutenant Allan Frederick Burke – Otago Regiment.
- Lieutenant (Temporary Captain) John Walter Frederick Cahill – New Zealand Army Service Corps.
- Regimental Sergeant Major Henry Lower Carter – New Zealand Artillery.
- Captain Percy Chisholm – New Zealand Medical Corps.
- Captain William Caesar Sarsfield Colclough – New Zealand Staff Corps.
- Major Albert Arthur Corrigan.
- Captain David Cecil Wallace Cossgrove.
- Major Walter Crowther.
- Captain William Dobson.
- Lieutenant David Alexander Ewen.
- Lieutenant Percy John Richmond Fordham – Otago Mounted Rifles.
- Captain Frederick Charles Gentry.
- Lieutenant Sylvester Gresham Hale – New Zealand Provost Corps.
- Captain Sydney Hartley Hay – New Zealand Medical Corps.
- Major Arthur Hosking – New Zealand Medical Corps.
- Major William Richmond Hursthouse – New Zealand Dental Service.
- Captain David Nathan Isaacs – New Zealand Medical Corps.
- Lieutenant William Jack – New Zealand Medical Corps.
- Major Henry Jolly.
- Captain James Robert Kirk – Wellington Regiment.
- Lieutenant Harry Aloysius Lockington – New Zealand Engineers.
- Captain Edward Cronin Lowe MB – New Zealand Army Medical Corps.
- 2nd Lieutenant Gordon Tate Lucas – New Zealand Machine Gun Corps.
- The Reverend Edward Elliott Maiden – New Zealand Chaplains' Department.
- Captain James Seaton Martin – New Zealand Army Pay Corps.
- Major Robert Saxon Matthews – New Zealand Staff Corps.
- Captain Samuel Mellows.
- Major Odin Henry Moller.
- 2nd Lieutenant Frederick William Mothes – Wellington Mounted Rifles.
- Major James Alfred Northcote.
- Lieutenant (Temporary Captain) Paul Rodolfo Noseda – Wellington Infantry Regiment.
- Major Henry Charles Nutsford – New Zealand Staff Corps.
- Captain Matthew Henry Oram.
- Lieutenant Henry William Osborne – Canterbury Regiment.
- Major William Haddon Pettit – New Zealand Medical Corps.
- Captain Lawrence Victor Porteous – Wellington Regiment.
- Captain William Pryor.
- Lieutenant Arthur Gilbert Quartley – Auckland Regiment.
- Captain Henry Joseph Redmond – New Zealand Staff Corps.
- 2nd Lieutenant Arthur James Ridler – New Zealand Field Artillery.
- Major Thomas Hazlett Ringland.
- Major Norman John Rishworth – New Zealand Dental Service.
- Major David Brett Shand.
- 2nd Lieutenant (Temporary Lieutenant) Norman Charles Sheridan – New Zealand Provost Corps.
- Lieutenant (Acting Captain) Keith Lindsay Stewart – Wellington Mounted Rifles Regiment.
- Captain Henry Caldwell Tait – New Zealand Medical Corps.
- Lieutenant (Temporary Captain) Herbert Tipping – Auckland Infantry Regiment.
- Captain George Walker – New Zealand Staff Corps.
- 2nd Lieutenant (Temporary Captain) Thomas Samuel West – Canterbury Regiment.
- The Reverend Walter Sim Winton – New Zealand Chaplains' Department.
- Captain Roy Wilds Fry Wood – Auckland Regiment.
George Rodda

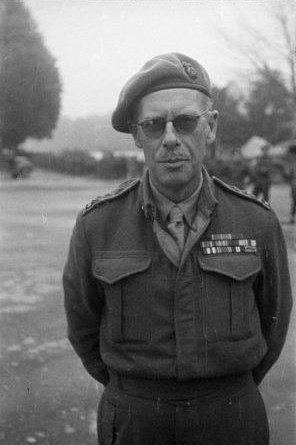
Keith Stewart

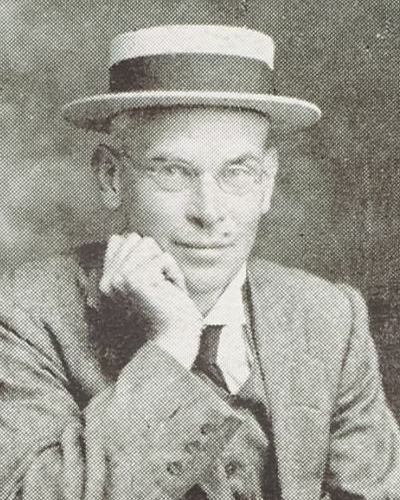
Cecil Wray

== Companion of the Imperial Service Order (ISO) ==
- William Stonham Short – under-secretary, Public Works Department.
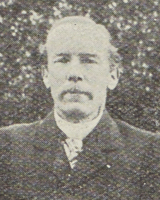
William Short

== Companion of the Distinguished Service Order (DSO) ==
- Lieutenant-Colonel Rawdon St John Beere – 4th Battalion, New Zealand Rifle Brigade.
- Major (Temporary Lieutenant-Colonel) Philip John Jory MB – 2nd Field Ambulance, New Zealand Medical Corps.
- Major Alexander Allan MacNab – 3rd New Zealand Rifle Brigade
- Lieutenant-Colonel Robert Stirrat McQuarrie MC – Headquarters, 3rd Brigade, New Zealand Field Artillery.
- Lieutenant-Colonel Owen Herbert Mead – 2nd Battalion, Canterbury Regiment.
- Major Erima Harvey Northcroft – 1st Battery, 1st Brigade, New Zealand Field Artillery.
- Major Alan Bernard Williams – 5th Battery, 2nd Brigade, New Zealand Field Artillery.
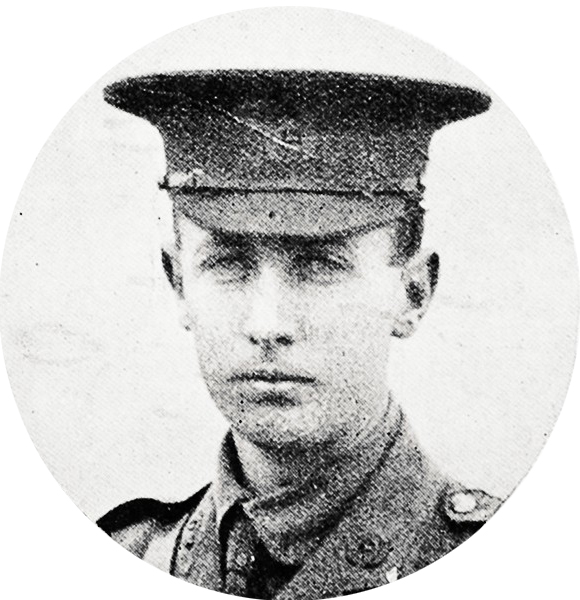
Owen Mead

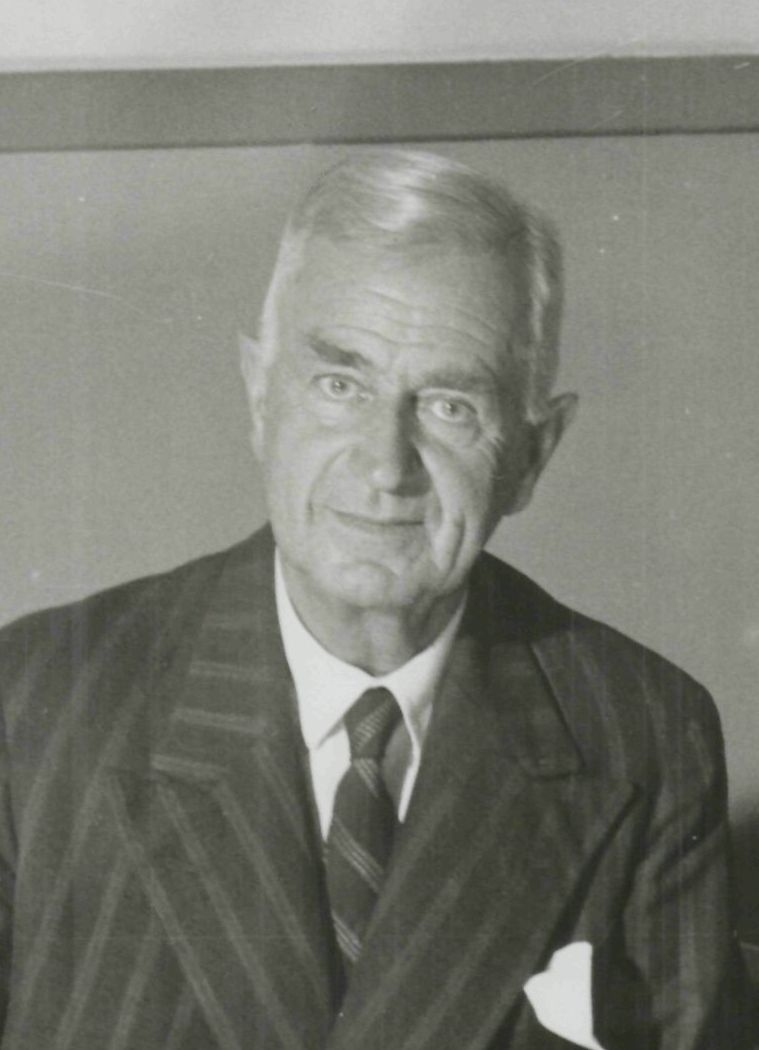
Erima Northcroft

== Royal Red Cross ==
=== Bar to Royal Red Cross (RRC*) ===
- Evelyn Gertrude Brooke RRC – matron, New Zealand Army Nursing Service.

=== Member (RRC) ===
- Sarah Louisa Clark – sister, New Zealand Army Nursing Service.
- Blanche Marion Huddleston ARRC – sister, New Zealand Army Nursing Service.
- Alicia Campbell Ingles ARRC – sister, New Zealand Army Nursing Service.

=== Associate (ARRC) ===
- Catherine Rose Clark – sister, New Zealand Army Nursing Service.
- Margaret Georgina Davies – sister, New Zealand Army Nursing Service.
- Alice Blanche Finlayson – sister, New Zealand Army Nursing Service.
- Edith Grace Hay – sister, New Zealand Army Nursing Service.
- Sarah Elizabeth Morley – sister, New Zealand Army Nursing Service.
- Alice Brash Smith – sister, New Zealand Army Nursing Service.
- Violet Maud Trott – sister, New Zealand Army Nursing Service.

== Bar to Military Cross (MC*) ==
- Captain (now Major) Henry Delphus McHugh MC – New Zealand Cyclist Battalion, attached XXII Corps Mounted Troops.

== Military Cross (MC) ==
- Lieutenant John Sinclair Chisholm – 2nd Battalion, Canterbury Regiment.
- 2nd Lieutenant Philip Sidney Cousins – 1at Battalion, Auckland Regiment.
- Lieutenant Malcolm Keith Draffin – 3rd Field Company, New Zealand Engineers.
- Captain William Ellis Earnshaw – 12th Battery, 3rd Brigade, New Zealand Field Artillery.
- Lieutenant Edgar Beilby Edwards – 4th Battalion, New Zealand Rifle Brigade.
- Lieutenant James Watt Fraser – 1st Battalion, Canterbury Regiment.
- Captain John Graham Gow MB – New Zealand Medical Corps, attached Wellington Mounted Rifles Regiment.
- Captain George Walter Horn – New Zealand Machine Gun Battalion.
- 2nd Lieutenant Hohepa Jacob – New Zealand Maori Battalion.
- Lieutenant Gordon Cosgrove Laws – 1st Battalion, Wellington Regiment.
- Lieutenant Nairn Victor Le Petit – Auckland Regiment, attached Headquarters, 1st New Zealand Infantry Brigade.
- Lieutenant William Gordon Lyons – Wellington Mounted Rifles Regiment.
- Captain Leslie Robert Cathcart MacFarlane – Canterbury Mounted Rifles Regiment.
- Lieutenant Kenneth John Mackenzie – 2nd Battalion, Otago Regiment.
- Lieutenant Ernest Marsden – New Zealand Engineers, attached 5th Field Survey Battalion, Royal Engineers.
- Lieutenant Valentine Marshall – Headquarters, 3rd New Zealand Rifle Brigade.
- 2nd Lieutenant Ernest Sydney Mayn – 2nd Battalion, Otago Regiment.
- Lieutenant William Stewart Rae – 3rd Field Company, New Zealand Engineers.
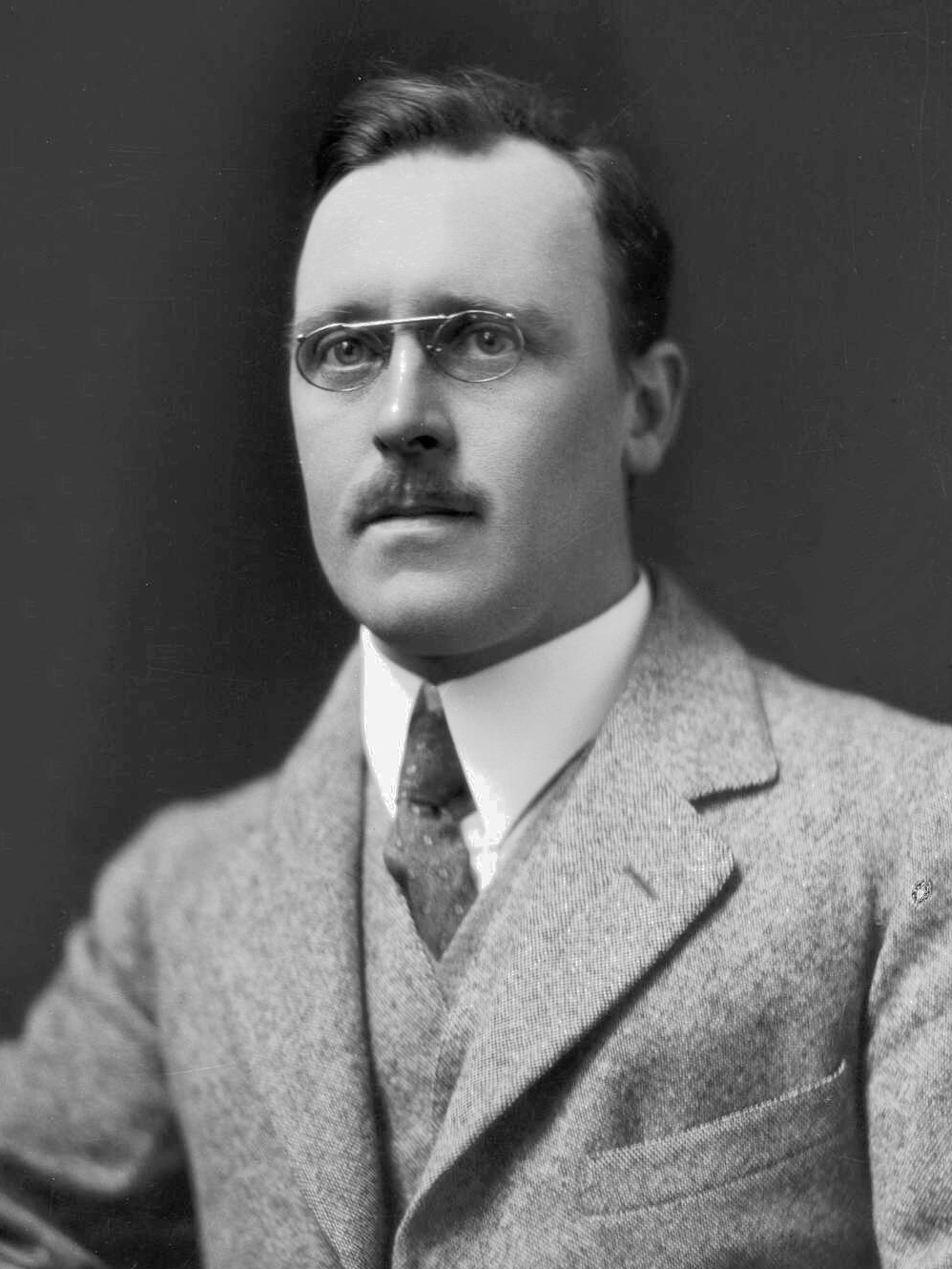
Ernest Marsden

== Distinguished Conduct Medal (DCM) ==
- Staff Sergeant Leonard Andrew Berg MM – 1st Battalion, Otago Regiment.
- Quartermaster Sergeant George Birnie – 1st Battalion, Auckland Regiment.
- Sergeant William Robert Cherrie – 1st Battalion, New Zealand Rifle Brigade.
- Corporal Thomas Richard Crocker – 2nd Battalion, Wellington Regiment.
- Sergeant Albert Edward De Boo – 2nd Battalion, Canterbury Regiment.
- Corporal Jesse Cyril Dibble – 2nd Battalion, New Zealand Rifle Brigade.
- Private William Robert Douglas – 4th Battalion, New Zealand Rifle Brigade.
- Sergeant (now 2nd Lieutenant) Errol Spencer Ellingham – 1st Battalion, New Zealand Rifle Brigade.
- Private William Ferguson – 2nd Battalion, New Zealand Rifle Brigade, attached 3rd Light Trench Mortar Battery.
- Private Alan Fleming – 4th Battalion, New Zealand Rifle Brigade.
- Sergeant Raymond Everil Fortune – 1st Battalion, Otago Regiment.
- Company Sergeant-Major Jonathan Horsfall Foster – 2nd Battalion, Wellington Regiment.
- Sergeant Sydney Gaston – 1st Battalion, Wellington Regiment.
- Sergeant Theophilus Norris Hewlett – 2nd Battalion, Auckland Regiment.
- Company Sergeant-Major William Horace James – 1st Battalion, Wellington Regiment.
- Company Sergeant-Major William Peter McGillen – 2nd Battalion, New Zealand Rifle Brigade.
- Battery Sergeant-Major Phillip Douglas McRae – 4/3rd Brigade, New Zealand Field Artillery.
- Private Charles Herbert Nailer – Battalion, New Zealand Rifle Brigade.
- Private George James Nesbit – 1st Battalion, Otago Regiment.
- Sergeant James Lawrence O'Brien – 2nd Battalion, Auckland Regiment.
- Company Sergeant-Major Edward Olsen – 1st Battalion, New Zealand Rifle Brigade.
- Corporal George William Osbourne – New Zealand Field Artillery, attached Medium Trench Mortar Battery
- Lance Sergeant Livingstone Perry – 2nd Battalion, New Zealand Rifle Brigade.
- Battery Sergeant-Major William Lincoln Field Porter – 9/2nd Brigade, New Zealand Field Artillery.
- Battery Sergeant-Major Linton Harry Runciman – 7/1st Brigade, New Zealand Field Artillery.
- Company Sergeant-Major Sydney Smith – 4th Battalion, New Zealand Rifle Brigade.
- Sergeant John Hector Steele – 4th Battalion, New Zealand Rifle Brigade.
- Corporal Charles Taylor – 1st Battalion, New Zealand Rifle Brigade.
- Battery Sergeant-Major Giles Varrall – 1/1st Brigade, New Zealand Field Artillery.
- Private Joseph Ward – 2nd Battalion, Canterbury Regiment.

== Meritorious Service Medal ==
- Company Sergeant-Major Malcolm Abbot – New Zealand Provost Corps.
- Staff Sergeant-Major Robert Grant Anderson – New Zealand Defence Headquarters.
- Sergeant William James Annand – 1st Battalion, Canterbury Regiment.
- Bombardier (Temporary Staff Sergeant) Charles Louis William Armitage – New Zealand Field Artillery.
- Staff Quartermaster-Sergeant James Hastings Babington – New Zealand Army Pay Corps.
- Quartermaster Sergeant George Barnes – Canterbury Regiment.
- Sergeant William Keith Berry – New Zealand Medical Corps.
- Staff Sergeant-Major John Gordon Bethell – Auckland Regiment.
- Farrier Sergeant William Robson Blackall – 2nd Field Company, New Zealand Engineers.
- Staff Sergeant-Major H. L. Brighting – New Zealand Postal Service.
- Staff Sergeant James Arthur Brown – Otago Regiment.
- Staff Sergeant-Major Russell Eric Brown – New Zealand Army Pay Corps.
- Private William Edward Brown – 1st Battalion, Wellington Regiment.
- Driver (Temporary Bombardier) William Carrick – New Zealand Field Artillery.
- Sergeant Alfred Noble Carter – Auckland Regiment.
- Company Sergeant-Major Reginald Freeman Chapman – Wellington Regiment.
- Staff Sergeant-Major Edward Ernest Coghlan – New Zealand Army Pay Corps.
- Corporal Peter Francis Coira – Divisional Signal Company, New Zealand Engineers.
- Staff Quartermaster Sergeant A. J. Coles – New Zealand Army Pay Corps.
- 2nd Corporal William Andrew Comrie – 1st Field Company, New Zealand Engineers.
- Staff Sergeant-Major J. J. Connolly – New Zealand Postal Service.
- Quartermaster Sergeant Matthew Cooper – 1st Battalion, Wellington Regiment.
- Private Edmund Charles Cragg – New Zealand Cyclist Corps.
- Staff Sergeant-Major G. Dean – New Zealand Postal Service.
- Private (Lance Corporal) Walter George Dean – Tunnelling Company, New Zealand Engineers.
- Staff Quartermaster Sergeant Stanley Dimery – Auckland Regiment.
- Staff Sergeant-Major W. H. Donaldson – New Zealand Postal Service.
- Battery Quartermaster-Sergeant Hugh Dyson – New Zealand Engineers.
- Sergeant Harry Thomas Carter Edwards – Canterbury Regiment.
- Sergeant Erik Eriksen – Wellington Regiment.
- Corporal Sidney William Eustace – New Zealand Field Artillery.
- Staff Sergeant-Major Louis Casimer Fama – New Zealand Army Pay Corps.
- Staff Sergeant-Major Arthur Thomas Fenton – New Zealand Army Service Corps.
- Sapper Michael Fisher – Tunnelling Company, New Zealand Engineers.
- Sergeant Adam Francis – Otago Regiment.
- Staff Sergeant-Major Harry Lewis Stovell Frank – New Zealand Postal Service.
- Staff Sergeant Walter Charles Fraser – 1st Battalion, Canterbury Regiment.
- Sergeant James Alexander Gentles – Canterbury Regiment.
- Corporal (Temporary Sergeant) Percy Augustus Gerrand – New Zealand Engineers.
- Sergeant Jack Giffney – New Zealand Provost Corps.
- Private (Lance Corporal) Hugh Henry Gillespie – 2nd Battalion, Canterbury Regiment.
- Bandmaster Arthur Gilmour – New Zealand Army Ordnance Corps.
- Staff Sergeant-Major William Leonard Glanville – New Zealand Postal Service.
- Sergeant Patrick Joseph Graham – 1st Field Company, New Zealand Engineers.
- Company Quartermaster-Sergeant Charles Gray – Divisional Signal Company, New Zealand Engineers.
- Sergeant James Charles Greig – Army Postal Service.
- Staff Sergeant-Major H. F. Griffen – New Zealand Army Pay Corps.
- Sergeant Matthew Henderson Grigg – 1st Field Company, New Zealand Engineers.
- Staff Sergeant Herbert Hilton Goulden – Auckland Regiment.
- Sergeant-Major Cyril Victor Neville Harris – Auckland Regiment.
- Regimental Sergeant-Major Sidney John Harrison – New Zealand Army Pay Corps.
- Sergeant Charles Hart – New Zealand Provost Corps.
- Conductor Mark Leonard Hathaway – New Zealand Army Ordnance Corps.
- Staff Sergeant-Major Alfred Richard Hatt – New Zealand Postal Service.
- Staff Sergeant George Henry Hawes – New Zealand Medical Corps.
- Company Quartermaster Sergeant William Arthur Head – 1st Battalion, Canterbury Regiment.
- 2nd Corporal Albert McLaren Heath – 2nd Field Company, New Zealand Engineers.
- Sergeant David Alexander Hedley – New Zealand Army Service Corps.
- Private Ernest Job Herbert – 1st Battalion, Wellington Regiment.
- Staff Sergeant Cecil Hastings Herdson – New Zealand Dental Corps.
- Quartermaster Sergeant Henry Leonard Hindmarsh – New Zealand Medical Corps
- Sergeant Arthur Bramwell Hudson – 15th Battery, 1st Brigade, New Zealand Field Artillery.
- Staff Sergeant James Bernard Hunt – Machine Gun Corps.
- Staff Sergeant Adam Dickson Johnston – New Zealand Army Service Corps.
- Regimental Sergeant-Major E. A. Johnston – New Zealand Medical Corps.
- Sergeant Bernard Jones – 3rd Battalion, New Zealand Rifle Brigade.
- Sergeant (Temporary Company Sergeant-Major) Henry William Thomas Jones – Otago Regiment.
- Regimental Sergeant-Major George Keeble – New Zealand Artillery.
- Staff Sergeant-Major Robert Arthur Kerr – New Zealand Medical Corps.
- Staff Quartermaster Sergeant Henry Kitson – Canterbury Regiment.
- Driver Isaac Samuel Justice Knox – New Zealand Army Service Corps.
- Corporal Eric Leslie Desmond Lees – New Zealand Provost Corps.
- Driver William Mackie Leitch – 6th Battery, 2nd Brigade, New Zealand Field Artillery.
- Staff Sergeant D. L. Lewis – New Zealand Postal Service.
- Staff Sergeant-Major R. V. Logie – New Zealand Army Pay Corps.
- Regimental Sergeant-Major Roland Henry Lomax – 2nd Battalion, New Zealand Rifle Brigade.
- Staff Quartermaster Sergeant David Hobson Lundon – Wellington Mtd. Rif.
- Sergeant Robert Macauley – 13th Battery, 3rd Brigade, New Zealand Field Artillery.
- Staff Sergeant James MacGregor – New Zealand Rifle Brigade.
- Staff Sergeant Benjamin Goudie MacLachlan – Canterbury Regiment.
- Staff Sergeant-Major Arthur Edgar Manners – New Zealand Field Artillery.
- Staff Quartermaster Sergeant Frank Victor Manning – New Zealand Engineers.
- Temporary Corporal Edmund Townley Marr – New Zealand Rifle Brigade.
- Staff Sergeant Charles Herbert Mayne – New Zealand Rifle Brigade.
- Private James John McGovern – Auckland Regiment.
- Private Charles James McGrath – 2nd Battalion, Wellington Regiment.
- Staff Sergeant-Major James Emmett Mclvor – New Zealand Rifle Brigade.
- Corporal (Acting Sergeant) James McKay – New Zealand Rifle Brigade.
- Warrant Officer Class I Peter Charles McLaren – New Zealand Medical Corps.
- Corporal J. McLaughlin – Otago Mounted Regiment.
- Sergeant Gavin Horace Menzies – Wellington Regiment.
- Company Quartermaster Sergeant George Miller – Otago Regiment.
- Staff Sergeant-Major George Thomson Miller – Wellington Mounted Rifles Regiment.
- Sergeant Charles Ural Milner – Army Postal Service.
- Staff Sergeant-Major Edward Gilbert Mountree – New Zealand Medical Corps.
- Staff Sergeant Harold Kenneth Nicholson – 2nd Battalion, Otago Regiment.
- Staff Sergeant Edmond William Patrick Nolan – Otago Regiment.
- Staff Sergeant-Major Edwin Roland Norrie – New Zealand Medical Corps.
- Company Sergeant-Major Herbert Nuttall – Canterbury Regiment.
- Staff Sergeant-Major Edward Francis O'Brien – New Zealand Provost Corps.
- Sergeant-Major John Goutenoire O'Brien – New Zealand Army Ordnance Corps.
- Staff Sergeant-Major John William O'Brien – Wellington Mounted Rifles Regiment.
- Staff Sergeant-Major George Winefride O'Sullivan – New Zealand Postal Service.
- Staff Sergeant-Major Arthur Francis Parfitt – New Zealand Army Pay Corps.
- Quartermaster Sergeant William Hans Parkinson – New Zealand Medical Corps.
- Company Quartermaster Sergeant Ivan Patterson – New Zealand Army Service Corps.
- Warrant Officer Class I Jack Porteous – New Zealand Rifle Brigade.
- Staff Sergeant David Findlay Porter – Wellington Mounted Rifles Regiment.
- Company Sergeant-Major William Price – Canterbury Regiment.
- Staff Sergeant Ernest Radd – New Zealand Provost Corps.
- Private James McHardy Rattray – 3rd Battalion, New Zealand Rifle Brigade.
- Private James Anthony Rodgers – 12th Battery, 3rd Brigade, New Zealand Field Artillery.
- Staff Sergeant William James Rogers – 2nd Battalion, Canterbury Regiment.
- Staff Sergeant David Edward Lawrence Rose – Wellington Regiment.
- Staff Sergeant Horace Charles Douglas Salmon – Wellington Regiment.
- Staff Sergeant John Robert Sclater – 3rd Field Ambulance, New Zealand Medical Corps.
- Conductor Clarence Adrian Seay – New Zealand Army Ordnance Corps.
- Bandmaster Benjamin John Shardlow – 1st Battalion, New Zealand Rifle Brigade.
- Staff Sergeant Thomas James Sherrard – New Zealand Medical Corps.
- Staff Sergeant Andrew Daniel Sinclair – New Zealand Divisional Headquarters.
- Staff Sergeant-Major Harry Sinclair – New Zealand Field Artillery.
- Staff Sergeant Alan Anthony Slater – New Zealand Army Service Corps.
- Staff Sergeant-Major Arthur William Spragg – Otago Regiment.
- Driver Rginald Stevens – New Zealand Army Service Corps.
- Corporal Robert William Thomas – 2nd Battalion, Canterbury Regiment.
- Staff Sergeant Albert Edward Thompson – Auckland Regiment.
- Sergeant Reginald Thurlow – New Zealand Engineers.
- Company Sergeant-Major David Alfred Wilson Toye – Wellington Regiment.
- Staff Quartermaster Sergeant R. N. Uren – New Zealand Postal Service.
- Quartermaster Sergeant John Henry Ussher – Otago Mounted Rifles Squadron.
- Company Quartermaster Sergeant George Waddington – 1st Battalion, Canterbury Regiment.
- Company Sergeant-Major Joseph Young Warren – Auckland Regiment.
- Staff Sergeant-Major Frederick William Webb – New Zealand Army Pay Corps.
- Company Quartermaster Sergeant John Walter Weeks – Machine Gun Corps.
- Staff Quartermaster Sergeant W. J. White – New Zealand Army Pay Corps.
- Sergeant Herbert Ralph Williams – 2nd Battalion, Canterbury Regiment.
- Driver Walter Wiseman – New Zealand Army Service Corps.
- Regimental Sergeant-Major Evelyn Crawford Wood – New Zealand Medical Corps.
