= General Braithwaite =

General Braithwaite may refer to:

- Sir John Braithwaite, 1st Baronet (1739–1803), Madras Army major general
- Walter Braithwaite (1865–1945), British Army general
- William Garnett Braithwaite (1870–1937), British Army brigadier general
