= Hugh Stewart (classical scholar) =

British-New Zealander academic (1884–1934)

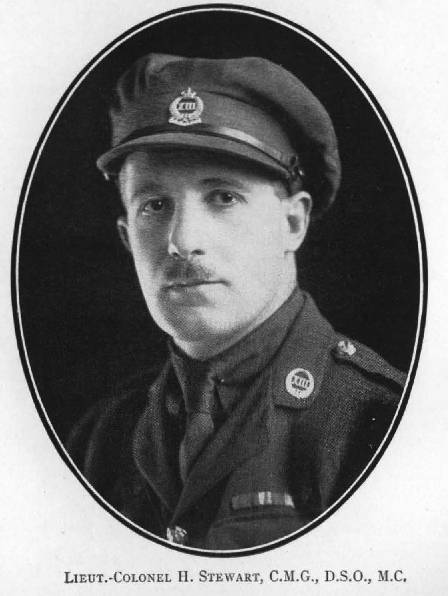
- Portrait of Hugh Stewart, a lieutenant colonel at the time, c. 1916–18
- Born: 1 September 1884; Premnay, Aberdeenshire, Scotland
- Died: 21 September 1934 (aged 50); At sea, en route to England
- Military career
- Allegiance: United Kingdom; New Zealand
- Branch: Territorial Force; New Zealand Military Forces
- Service years: c. 1904–07; 1914–19
- Rank: Lieutenant Colonel
- Commands: 2nd infantry Brigade; 2nd Battalion, Canterbury Infantry Regiment
- Conflicts: First World War; Gallipoli Campaign; Western Front
- Awards: Companion of the Order of St Michael and St George; Distinguished Service Order & Bar; Military Cross; Mentioned in despatches (5); Croix de guerre (France)
- Other work: Author; Classical scholar Historian

Hugh Stewart, CMG, DSO & Bar, MC (1 September 1884 – 21 September 1934) was an academic, soldier and historian whose work had a major impact in both England and New Zealand.

Born in Scotland, Stewart worked in Russia teaching English after completing his education. He then taught classical studies at the University of Liverpool in England and then at Canterbury College in Christchurch, New Zealand. During the First World War, he volunteered for service abroad with the New Zealand Expeditionary Force. He participated in several engagements at Gallipoli and on the Western Front, and was decorated for bravery and leadership. He ended the war as a lieutenant colonel commanding a battalion of the Canterbury Infantry Regiment, having also led briefly the 2nd Infantry Brigade.

After the war, Stewart wrote a history of the New Zealand Division, which was published in 1921 and was its main reference work for several decades. He resumed his teaching career at Canterbury College but in 1926 returned to England, as a professor of Latin at the University of Leeds. In 1929, he became the principal of University College of Nottingham. He died suddenly in 1934 while in transit to England after a holiday in New Zealand.

== Early life and teaching career ==
Stewart was born on 1 September 1884 in Premnay, Aberdeenshire, Scotland, to John Stewart, a Presbyterian minister and Margaret Mackintosh. He was educated at the local public school in Premnay. An excellent student, he earned a scholarship to Fettes College at Edinburgh. In 1903, he attended the University of Edinburgh and then transferred to Trinity College, Cambridge, from which he received his Bachelor of Arts degree in 1907, majoring in Classical Studies. During his tertiary education he also served in the Territorial Force as a lieutenant in the 6th Battalion, King's Regiment (Liverpool).

Stewart spent the next two years working in Russia as a tutor, teaching English. He learned Russian and wrote a book describing his experiences and the country, Provincial Russia. Returning to England, he took up an appointment as Assistant Lecturer in Classics at the University of Liverpool. In 1912, he accepted a professorship teaching classics at Canterbury College, in Christchurch, New Zealand. At the college, later to become the University of Canterbury, he acquired a reputation for his energy and wit. In his leisure time, he often went climbing in the Southern Alps.

== First World War ==
When the First World War broke out in August 1914, Stewart enlisted in the New Zealand Expeditionary Force (NZEF). He received a commission as a lieutenant and was posted to the Canterbury Battalion, New Zealand Infantry Brigade, which embarked from Wellington in October 1914 for Suez, Egypt. In Egypt, the brigade was combined with an Australian infantry brigade to form the New Zealand and Australian Division, intended for service in the Gallipoli Campaign.

Stewart served at Gallipoli and received a head wound during the fighting at Quinn's Post in June 1915 but, despite this, remained on the frontline. He was promoted to captain in August, and to major two months later. He was recommended for the Military Cross for his action at Quinn's Post and this was duly gazetted following the withdrawal of the Allies from Gallipoli. He was also awarded the French Croix de guerre for his "distinguished services rendered during the course of the campaign".

By January 1916, the manpower of the NZEF had expanded sufficiently that it could field an infantry division on the Western Front. The New Zealand and Australian Division, which had been evacuated to Egypt from Gallipoli, was disbanded and the New Zealand Division created from the original infantry brigade and two new brigades (the 2nd Infantry Brigade and New Zealand Rifle Brigade), which had recently arrived from New Zealand. Promoted to lieutenant colonel on 27 February 1916, Stewart took command of the new 2nd Battalion, Canterbury Infantry Regiment, which was attached to the 2nd Infantry Brigade. He led the battalion for nearly the duration of its service on the Western Front.

In June 1917, Stewart was awarded the Distinguished Service Order (DSO) in recognition of his leadership of his battalion during the Battle of Flers–Courcelette in September 1916. He had planned and executed an attack by his battalion on German-held trenches and once the objective was captured, organised its defence against several counter-attacks. He was awarded a Bar to his DSO six months later, for his efforts during the Battle of Messines during which he was wounded. His injuries were severe, due to eight shrapnel wounds and he was evacuated to London for treatment. Returning to the field in late 1917, he was temporary commander of the 2nd Infantry Brigade at various times during 1918, while its regular commander was on leave or employed elsewhere. While on leave, on 21 February 1918, Stewart married Alexandrina Kathleen Johnston at Uttoxeter, in the county of Staffordshire in England.

Just after the cessation of hostilities he was temporarily promoted to colonel and was appointed Director of Education for the NZEF. He remained at that post through to February 1919 at which time he was discharged from the NZEF, having reverted to his substantive rank of lieutenant colonel. During the course of the war, Stewart had been mentioned in despatches five times. In the 1919 King's Birthday Honours, he was appointed a Companion of the Order of St Michael and St George and his citation noted his leadership of his battalion and temporary command of 2nd Infantry Brigade as well as his educational work for the NZEF.

== Postwar life ==
Stewart was commissioned by the New Zealand Government to write a history of the New Zealand Division and its service on the Western Front as part of the Official History of New Zealand's Effort in the Great War. He began work on the first draft in January 1919, while still in England. He returned to New Zealand in December that year and resumed his pre-war teaching position at Canterbury College, while continuing work on his history. The final result, titled The New Zealand Division 1916 – 1919: A Popular History Based on Official Records, was published in 1921 and was the primary reference for New Zealand's contribution to the campaign on the Western Front for several decades. Prior to its publication, Stewart's wife died shortly after giving birth to a son.

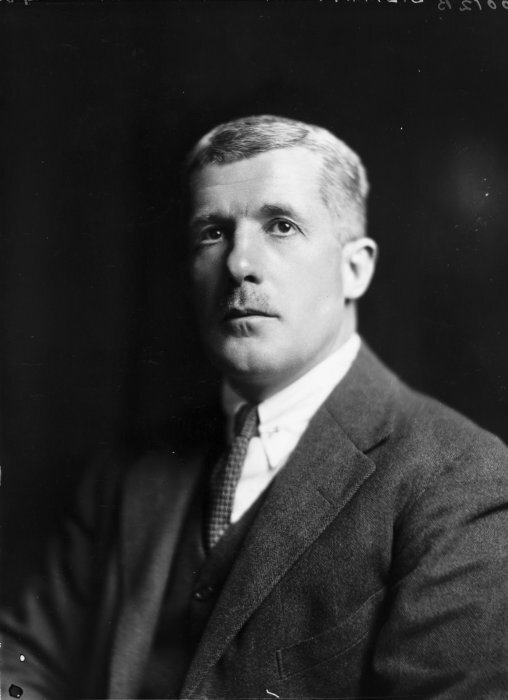
A portrait of Hugh Stewart, 1926

Although discharged from the NZEF, Stewart was still in the military reserve and commanded a battalion of the Territorial Force (TF). He was later given command of the TF's 3rd Infantry Brigade. From 1924 to 1926, he was president of the New Zealand Returned Servicemen's Association. His leadership of the association ended when he left New Zealand to become Professor of Latin at the University of Leeds.

On 28 July 1927, Stewart married Margaret Rosamond Poulton at Kinlet, Shropshire, England. This marriage, Stewart's second, was brief; she and their baby son, died during childbirth in August 1928. In 1929 Stewart was appointed principal of University College of Nottingham, later to become the University of Nottingham. In a history of the University of Canterbury, published in 1973, the authors wrote that Stewart was the "most able leader and administrator ... the College [of Nottingham] ever had". The year after his move to Nottingham, Stewart married Margaret Isabel Massey in London. The couple had two children, a daughter and a son.

Stewart travelled to New Zealand on holiday in August 1934 and resumed many of his past military acquaintances. While on passage to England he died unexpectedly aboard the ship Akaroa and was buried at sea. He was survived by his third wife and his three children.

== Legacy ==
After his death, Stewart was honoured by the renaming of Lenton Hall of Residence at the University of Nottingham to Hugh Stewart Hall. The university also named a scholarship after him. A tablet in his honour was unveiled on 18 January 1935 at the premises of the Christchurch Returned Soldier's Association by the former commander of the NZEF, Alexander Godley.
