= Robert Young (New Zealand Army officer) =

NZ Army Major General (1877–1953)

Major General Robert Young
- Brigadier General Robert Young
- Born: 5 January 1877; Sunderland, England
- Died: 25 February 1953 (aged 76); Ōtaki, New Zealand
- Military career
- Allegiance: New Zealand
- Branch: New Zealand Military Forces
- Service years: 1898–1931; 1941–1944
- Rank: Major General
- Units: New Zealand Infantry Brigade; New Zealand and Australian Division; New Zealand Division; New Zealand Expeditionary Force
- Conflicts: World War I World War II
- Awards: Companion of the Order of the Bath; Companion of the Order of St Michael and St George; Distinguished Service Order; Mentioned in Despatches; Légion d'honneur

Major General Robert Young, CB, CMG, DSO (5 January 1877 – 25 February 1953) was a dentist, volunteer soldier, World War I brigade commander and professional soldier in the New Zealand Military Forces.

A British immigrant who came to New Zealand as a child, Young he later rose to serve as a General Officer Commanding, New Zealand Military Forces from 1925 to 1931. For service during World War I he was awarded the Distinguished Service Order, mentioned in despatches, and was one of only 14 members of the New Zealand Military Forces to receive the French Legion of Honour during the war.

== Early life ==
Born at Sunderland, England, in 1877 Young came to New Zealand with his parents as a child. The son of Reverend Robert Young, the Vicar of St Mark's in Carterton, he was educated at Nelson College and after further study began practice as a dentist. His history of military service began in 1898 when he joined the New Zealand Volunteer Forces, serving in the Amuri Mounted Rifles (which was subsequently absorbed into the Canterbury Yeomanry Cavalry). Following his marriage to Florence Ward in 1899 he settled in Marton and began service with the Royal Rifles, rising to the rank of captain in 1910 before the unit was incorporated into the new 7th (Wellington-West Coast) Regiment in 1911.

== World War I ==
After the New Zealand Government declared war on Germany and made the decision to establish a New Zealand Expeditionary Force (NZEF) for overseas service, the Wellington Infantry Battalion was formed and began concentrating at Awapuni racecourse in Palmerston North from 12 August 1914. Young joined the unit in the Manawatu and was subsequently promoted to major and appointed officer commanding the 9th (Hawke's Bay) Company.

The battalion formed part of the New Zealand Infantry Brigade, commanded by Brigadier-General Francis Earl Johnston, and Young departed New Zealand on board the troopship Limerick on 15 October 1914. This vessel was one of twelve troop ships of the main body of the NZEF escorted in convoy by Allied warships, which stopped at Hobart, Albany and Colombo before arriving at the Suez Canal on 1 December 1914. The NZEF established a training camp at Zeitoun and Young, under the direction of his commanding officer Lieutenant Colonel William George Malone, began training his 9th (Hawke's Bay) Company troops until the New Zealand Infantry Brigade was called forward to participate in British operations against the Ottomans in the Suez Canal area from January to February 1915. On return from the field the battalion resumed its training, until the newly formed New Zealand and Australian Division departed for the invasion of the Gallipoli Peninsula in late April 1915.

=== Gallipoli ===
Young landed at Anzac Cove with the battalion on 25 April 1915 and soon gained prominence as a strong military leader. His 9th (Hawke's Bay) Company moved up Walker's Ridge and defended positions at the Nek from continual Ottoman attacks, in what has been described as some of the severest fighting during the first day of the landings. Young helped push back a series of Turkish counter-attacks on 27 April and supported New Zealand attempts to breakout from the Anzac perimeter on 3 May. He was placed in command of the Auckland Battalion after their near destruction at Helles during the fight at the Daisy Patch and promoted to temporary lieutenant colonel. Young led the Aucklanders during the August Offensive when they sustained significant casualties in an assault at the Pinnacle on 7 August in their bid to take Chunuk Bair.

Young remained in charge of the depleted Auckland Battalion as they defended positions on Rhododendron Spur throughout September before they were withdrawn to Lemnos to recuperate. After the battalion returned to Gallipoli he handed the unit back to Lieutenant Colonel Arthur Plugge on 20 November, and then took command of the Canterbury Battalion where he was confirmed as a substantive lieutenant colonel. Young was placed in charge of all New Zealand Infantry Brigade rear parties as the New Zealanders withdrew from the Gallipoli Peninsula in the early hours of the morning on 20 December 1915.

=== Western Front ===
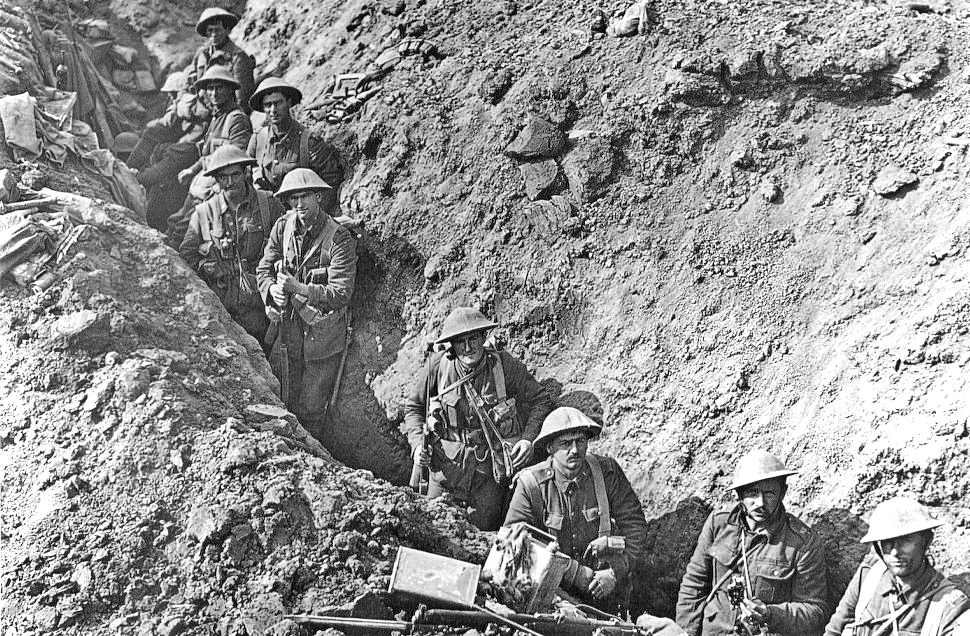
New Zealanders during the Battle of the Somme

After the withdrawal from Gallipoli, the NZEF had sufficient personnel to expand by two additional infantry brigades. These were the newly arrived 2nd Infantry Brigade and the New Zealand Rifle Brigade, which with the original brigade, now designated the 1st Infantry Brigade, formed the New Zealand Division. The division was transferred to the Western Front in May 1916 under the command of Major-general Andrew Hamilton Russell, with Young remaining in charge of what was now designated the 1st Canterbury Battalion. He commanded the battalion as it became acclimatised to warfare on the Western Front at Armentières, and led it during New Zealand participation in the Battle of the Somme in September 1916.

Young's capabilities as a commander were recognised when he was placed in temporary command of the 2nd Infantry Brigade from 31 December 1916 to 6 January 1917 and then subsequently attached to divisional headquarters for liaison work during the Battle for Messines in June. He took temporary command of the New Zealand Rifle Brigade in the rank of temporary brigadier general on 8 August when Brigadier General Francis Earl Johnston was killed in action, but his time as a brigade commander was short lived when he was shot in the neck just two days later and evacuated to London.

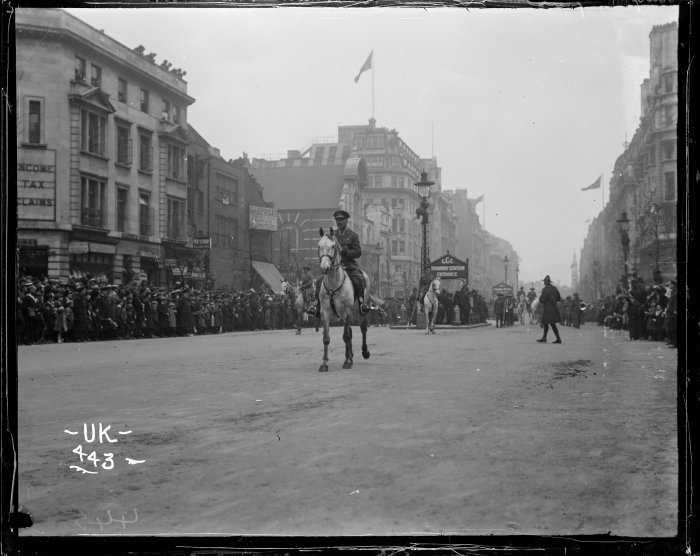
Young leading the New Zealand Contingent, London Victory Parade 1919

After recuperating in England, Young returned to the Western Front on 4 December and assumed command of the 1st Infantry Brigade with the rank of temporary brigadier-general. He was subsequently shifted to command of the 2nd Infantry Brigade on 19 February 1918, and led it during the German Spring Offensive which began in March 1918. He retained command of the brigade for the remainder of the war and saw further action at the Battle of Bapaume and in the push to the Hindenburg Line which contributed to German capitulation in November 1918.

=== Armistice ===
Young led his brigade into Germany after the cessation of hostilities, where they undertook garrison duties as part of the Allied army of occupation. Then as the NZEF began to draw down he was posted to Sling Camp in England on 10 April 1919, in command of a group of soldiers awaiting their return voyage to New Zealand. Unfortunately, delays in obtaining transports for the return home resulted in considerable impatience and culminated in a camp riot. Young, who was held in great respect by the New Zealand soldiers, was called on to sort the matter out and his arrangements to ensure that married men were returned before single men helped alleviate the situation.

Young had the honour of leading New Zealand forces in the victory parade through London in May 1919, before leaving England on 11 July 1919 for demobilisation. On arrival in New Zealand, Young was discharged from the NZEF on 21 October 1919, but chose to continue service with the Permanent Staff of the New Zealand Military Forces.

== Interwar period ==
After his return to New Zealand, Young was appointed honorary aide-de-camp to the governor general in 1920 and served as commander of the Canterbury Military District until 1921. He then served as commander of the Southern Military District until 7 December 1925 when he was promoted to major-general and appointed general officer commanding, New Zealand Military Forces. In this role Young was now the head of the army in which he had served since 1898, and key advisor on New Zealand military and defence issues to the New Zealand Government. He remained in this senior role until March 1931 when he retired, moving with his wife to Pohangia to assist their son on his sheep and cattle farm, before finally settling in Ōtaki.

== World War II ==
On the commencement of hostilities in August 1940 Young was appointed Dominion Commander of the Home Guard, and a year later director-general of the Home Guard in the rank of brigadier, based in Wellington. His task was to prepare and supervise a system of training sufficiently disciplined and thorough to create an "additional line of national defence of real potential value, and to hold the allegiance of men who have no spare time to give to mere paradings". The Home Guard's role was to limit the area of exploitation of any enemy invasion through the blocking of roads, demolitions, improvisation, and any other means of checking the invader. With the drain on skilled military instructors for the 2nd New Zealand Expeditionary Force, Young had to draw on the expertise of veteran officers and NCOs from World War I. He held this role until 1944 when the threat to New Zealand had sufficiently reduced to allow demobilisation of the Home Guard.

== Post-war ==
Young returned to Ōtaki after the war and became engaged in local affairs. He was elected to the Otaki Borough Council in 1945, was Horowhenua Power Board's Ōtaki representative and became a prominent member of the Otaki Bowling Club. He died in Ōtaki on 27 February 1953 at the age of 76. A well attended service was initially held in Ōtaki, before his coffin was taken by hearse to Thorndon, Wellington, where it was transferred to a gun-carriage and draped with the New Zealand flag in a funeral with full military honours. His ashes were subsequently interred at the Marton cemetery.

== Awards and decorations ==
In recognition of his outstanding bravery and leadership Young was awarded the Distinguished Service Order on 8 November 1915 for distinguished service in the field on Gallipoli. For his service as commanding officer of the Auckland Battalion on Gallipoli, Young was made a Companion of the Order of St Michael and St George, and later, for his leadership and gallant conduct as a brigade commander, he was appointed a Companion of the Order of the Bath in the 1919 King's Birthday Honours. Young was also Mentioned in Dispatches five times in recognition of his excellent service and appointed a Chevalier of the Légion d’honneur by the President of France in February 1916. This French award is uncommon to New Zealanders with fewer than 100 awards made, and Young was one of only 14 members of the NZEF to be decorated with the Legion of Honour during the War.

=== Ribbons ===
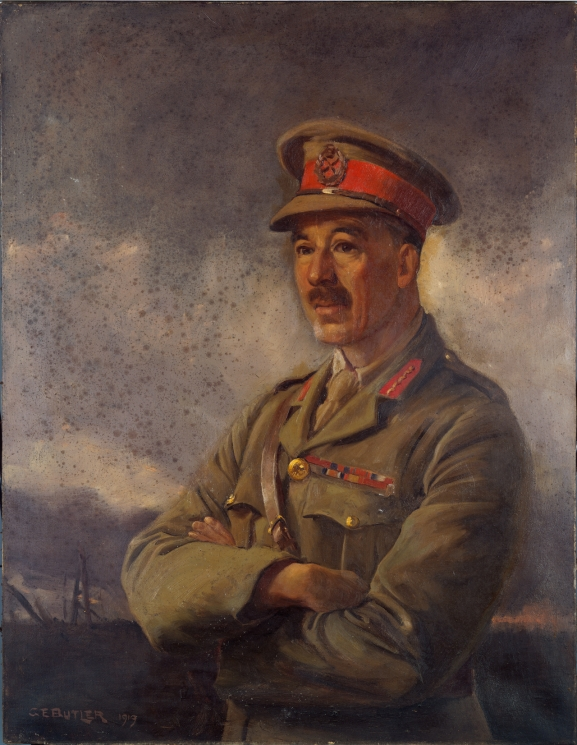
Brigadier General Robert Young, KCB CMG DSO, 1919

- Companion of the Order of the Bath (Great Britain)
- Companion of the Order of St Michael and St George (Great Britain)
- Distinguished Service Order (Great Britain)
- 1914–15 Star (Great Britain)
- British War Medal 1914–19 (Great Britain)
- Victory Medal with Mention in Despatches (five times) (Great Britain)
- War Medal 1939-45 (Great Britain)
- New Zealand War Service Medal (New Zealand)
- New Zealand Long and Efficient Service Medal (New Zealand)
- New Zealand Territorial Service Medal (New Zealand)
- Chevalier de la Légion d'Honneur (France)

== See also ==
- Military history of New Zealand in World War I
- List of foreign recipients of the Légion d'Honneur

== End notes ==
Military offices
Preceded by Major General Charles Melvill	Commandant of New Zealand Military Forces; December 1925–March 1931	Succeeded by Major General William Sinclair-Burgess
