= New Zealand Rifle Brigade (Earl of Liverpool's Own) =

The New Zealand Rifle Brigade
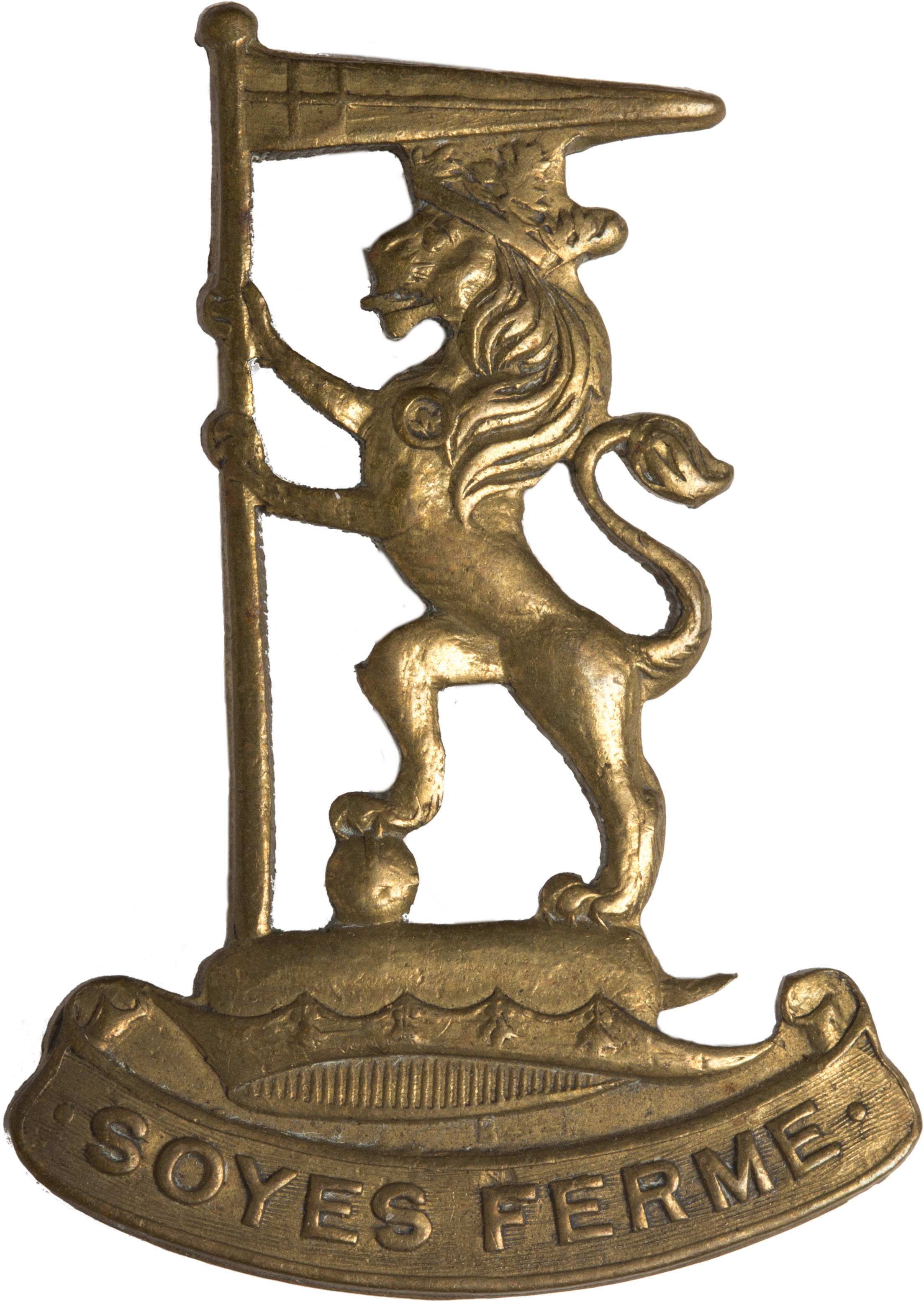
- Cap badge of the New Zealand Rifle Brigade
- Active: 1 May 1915 – 4 February 1919
- Country: New Zealand
- Type: Infantry
- Size: Four battalions
- Nickname: "The Dinks"
- Motto: Soyes Ferme
- Engagements: First World War

Commanders
- Honorary Colonel: Earl of Liverpool
- Colonel-in-Chief: Duke of Connaught
- Notable commanders: Harry Fulton; Herbert Ernest Hart

Insignia

The New Zealand Rifle Brigade (Earl of Liverpool's Own), affectionately known as The Dinks, was formed on 1 May 1915 as the third brigade of the New Zealand Division, part of the New Zealand Expeditionary Force. During the First World War it fought in Egypt, against the Senussi, and then on the Western Front. It was disbanded on 4 February 1919.

== Background ==
Following the outbreak of the First World War, the New Zealand government authorised the formation of the New Zealand Expeditionary Force (NZEF), under the command of Major General Alexander Godley, for service abroad. By October 1914, there were sufficient volunteers to form two brigades, the New Zealand Infantry Brigade and the New Zealand Mounted Brigade. These two formations formed the main body of the NZEF and, together with the Australian 4th Infantry Brigade and the 1st Light Horse Brigade, were the basis of the New Zealand and Australian Division, which fought in the Gallipoli campaign against the Turks.

In the meantime, another regiment of infantry was being raised, with effect from 1 May 1915. This regiment, the precursor to the New Zealand Rifle Brigade (NZRB), was to consist of two infantry battalions and was originally known as the Trentham Regiment (The Earl of Liverpool's Own). (Note: At the time of its formation, Arthur Foljambe, the Earl of Liverpool, was the Governor-General of New Zealand. A former rifleman of the British Rifle Brigade, he was honorary colonel of the Trentham Regiment and this carried over into its transition to the New Zealand Rifle Brigade.) The two battalions were placed under the command of Lieutenant Colonel Harry Fulton. (Note: Although a soldier in the Indian Army, Fulton had strong connections to New Zealand and had been on leave in the country when the First World War broke out. He had offered his services to the New Zealand government, which had accepted.) Later, as the first two battalions finished its training in New Zealand, the government decided to increase the strength of the regiment by adding two further battalions, thus bringing the regiment up to the size of a brigade. By this time, the Trentham Regiment's designation had been abolished and it was now officially known as the New Zealand Rifle Brigade (Earl of Liverpool's Own).

== Formation ==
The first personnel, the officers and non-commissioned officers, for the first two battalions of what was then the Trentham Regiment arrived at Trentham Camp, near Wellington, in late April 1915 for a period of instruction by staff of the New Zealand Staff Corps, supervised by Fulton. The main body of the regiment, around 2,200 soldiers, arrived at the end of the following month. Over 600 of these were from the Wellington Military District, while Auckland, Canterbury and Otago contributed over 500 soldiers each. In contrast to how the rest of the NZEF had been organised, the regiment had no provincial identity. Instead, battalions and companies had numerical designators. Thus, Fulton took command of 1st Battalion while Lieutenant Colonel Stewart was in charge of 2nd Battalion.

The regiment underwent training for the next few months, disrupted by a move to a camp near Palmerston North after an outbreak of meningitis at Trentham. Poor weather had also affected the camp grounds. In September 1915, an advance party of 50 men from both battalions were dispatched to Egypt via the Suez, with the rest of the two battalions to follow the following month with the 7th Reinforcements on 10 October 1915 aboard the transports Maunganui and Tahiti. Fulton's 1st Battalion arrived at Cairo on 14 November; the Tahiti, carrying the 2nd Battalion, was travelling to Suez via Colombo, and the men it was carrying would not arrive at the camp being set up near Cairo for a few more days.

== Egypt ==
The 1st and 2nd Battalions were attached for duties with the Western Frontier Force, which had been raised to counter a Senussi invasion from Libya. The 1st Battalion fought two actions south-west of Matruh as part of a mixed force (including British, Australians, and Indians), one on Christmas Day, the other on 23 January 1916. Both were successful and broke the back of the invasion.

By December 1915, the much depleted New Zealand and Australian Division had been evacuated from Gallipoli, and was placed in reserve near the Suez Canal. Since the deployment of the main body of the NZEF, the numbers of volunteers had steadily increased to the point that they could no longer be integrated into either of the two existing brigades. In January 1916, the commander of the Mediterranean Expeditionary Force in Egypt, Lieutenant General Sir Archibald Murray, proposed the number of available New Zealand personnel warranted the establishment of a New Zealand infantry division for service on the Western Front. The New Zealand government concurred after Murray provided assurances that there was sufficient NZEF personnel in Egypt to keep the new division up to strength in the short term.

To form the new infantry division, the original New Zealand Infantry Brigade was redesignated as the 1st Infantry Brigade while three battalions of reinforcements already in Egypt, with another inbound, was to form the 2nd Infantry Brigade. The two battalions of the NZRB in transit to Egypt from New Zealand would join the two battalions already in Egypt to form the completed third brigade of the division. The 3rd and 4th duly arrived in mid-March 1916 and after a period of reorganisation the full brigade left Alexandria on 7 April for France.

== France ==
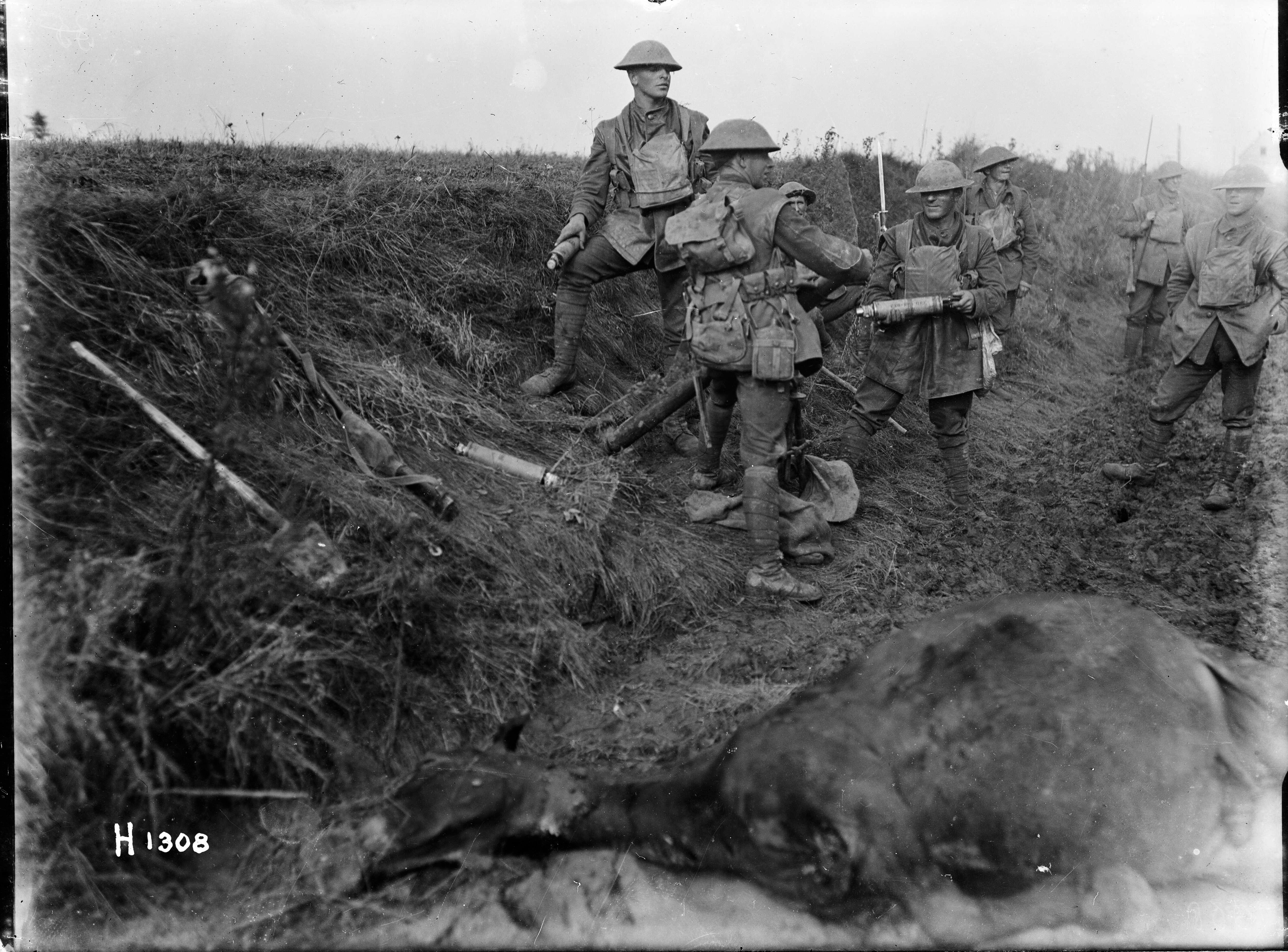
Members of the New Zealand Rifle Brigade operating a mortar at the front near Le Quesnoy, 1918

After a period of training the brigade entered the line on 13 May east of Armentières. It participated in the vast majority of the battles of 1916, 1917 and 1918. Notable examples include:

- The brigade's first major offensive was during the Battle of the Somme when it attacked on 15 September as part of the Battle of Flers-Courcelette.
- The Battle of Messines, possibly the most complete Allied victory of the war until late 1918.
- Third Ypres, normally described these days as Passchendaele.
- It was thrown into a gap in the line caused by the German attack, called Operation Michael, on 26 April 1918.
- Finally it fully participated in the Hundred Days Offensive that ultimately culminated inside Germany

== Disbandment ==
The NZRB, as part of the New Zealand Division, formed part of II Corps of the Second Army, assigned to the Army of Occupation on the Rhine. The NZRB made its way to Cologne, where it was to be stationed, on foot, beginning its march from France on 28 November 1918. It arrived at Cologne on 22 December 1918.

Its occupation duties were light, with morning parades and training sessions leaving time in the afternoon for sightseeing. An education programme was implemented although many men were more interested in returning to New Zealand. The NZEF had begun demobilising on 26 December 1918 and by the end of the following month, up to 1,000 personnel were leaving each week for England to catch ships destined for New Zealand. By mid-January 1919, the brigade's normal complement of four battalions had been reduced to two with the final units being disbanded on 4 February 1919.

The brigade was nicknamed The Dinks although its origin is unclear. It is generally understood to be a contraction of "Dinkum", meaning having excellence and quality. The nickname itself appears to date to the arrival of the 2nd Battalion in Egypt. The newly arrived personnel sought to maintain high standards of presentation and drill which the Gallipoli veterans also in Egypt considered to be excessive. They referred to the battalion as "Square Dinkums" but with disrespect, and this was later applied to the brigade as a whole once it had been assembled. Another possibility for the nickname is that following the 1st Battalion's engagement of December 1915 at Mersa Matruh against the Senussi, Gallipoli veterans ironically referred to it as "a fair dinkum fight", comparing to the much more intensive action experienced on the Gallipoli peninsula. Over time, the nickname was shortened to "The Dinks", and the brigade's personnel took pride in it as the nickname began to be used in a more respectful context as it established its reputation on the Western Front.

== Commanders ==
- William Garnett Braithwaite: December 1915 to February 1916;
- Harry Fulton: March 1916 to June 1917; November 1917 to March 1918;
- Herbert Ernest Hart: December 1916 to January 1917; July 1918 to February 1919;
- Francis Earl Johnston: July to August 1917;
- Robert Young: August 1917;
- Hugh Stewart: August to November 1917; July 1918.

The Duke of Connaught was appointed Colonel-in-Chief in 1916.

== Mascot ==
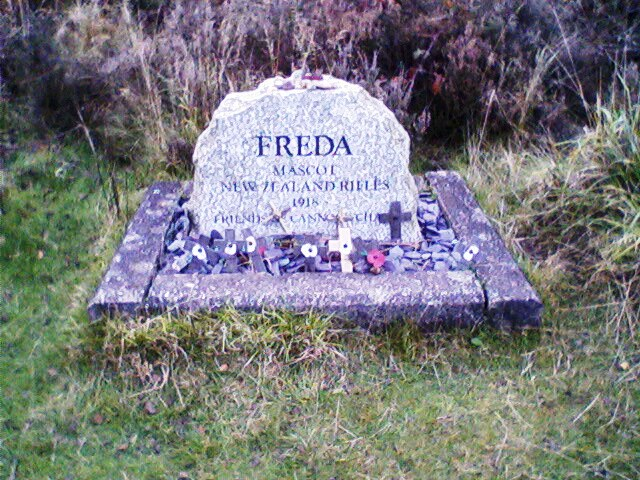
Marble headstone for Freda

The unit had a Harlequin Great Dane dog called Freda, as a mascot, which died in England in 1918. A marble memorial to the dog can be found on Cannock Chase in Staffordshire.

== Model WW1 battlefield ==
In September 2013, it was reported that Staffordshire County Council would excavate the World War I model battlefield near Brocton, Staffordshire, which had been constructed by German Prisoners of War held in a camp on nearby Cannock Chase and guarded by soldiers of the New Zealand Rifle Brigade (Earl of Liverpool's Own). The model of the village and surrounding area of Messines in Belgium, which included replica trenches and dugouts, railway lines, roads, and accurate contours of the surrounding terrain, would be open to public view for a few weeks before being buried over again to ensure its preservation. The excavation has revealed details of the 40 metre square battlefield which is said to be perfectly preserved. According to the BBC, the "Staffordshire County Council will be using laser-scanning technology to re-create the site as a 3D interactive model that can be explored online."

== Honours ==
Some of the personnel of the New Zealand Rifle Brigade were highly decorated, including two soldiers that were awarded the Victoria Cross; Lance Corporal Samuel Frickleton and Sergeant Harry Laurent. Two of the brigade's commanders, Brigadier Generals Hart and Melvill, were made Companions of the Order of the Bath. In addition, Melvill was appointed a Companion of the Order of St Michael and St George along with Brigadier Generals Fulton and Stewart. There were also three appointments to the Order of the British Empire. In addition, the following decorations were awarded to brigade personnel:

- 18 Distinguished Service Orders (including two bars);
- 94 Military Crosses (including five bars);
- 76 Distinguished Conduct Medals (including two bars); and
- 231 Military Medals (including eight bars).

Some 126 individuals were mentioned in dispatches, several more than once. There were also several foreign decorations awarded; there were 21 recipients of the French Croix de Guerre and 16 soldiers received the Belgian equivalent.
