= 2nd Infantry Brigade (New Zealand) =

- Active: 1916–1919; 1924–1964
- Country: New Zealand
- Branch: New Zealand Military Forces
- Type: Infantry
- Part of: New Zealand Division
- Engagements: First World War: Western Front

Commanders
- Notable commanders: William Garnett Braithwaite; Robert Young; Herbert Ernest Hart; Hugh Stewart

The 2nd Infantry Brigade was a formation of the New Zealand Military Forces raised for service abroad with the New Zealand Expeditionary Force during the First World War. As part of the New Zealand Division, it participated in several major battles on the Western Front from 1916 to 1918 before being disbanded in 1919. There was also a 2nd Infantry Brigade in the New Zealand Territorial Force that existed from 1924 to 1964.

== History ==
=== First World War ===
It was formed in Egypt in 1916 for service with the New Zealand Division on the Western Front. Its original commander was Brigadier General William Garnett Braithwaite, a British Army officer on secondment to the New Zealand Military Forces. Upon formation, the brigade consisted of four infantry battalions: the 2nd Battalion, Auckland Regiment; the 2nd Battalion, Wellington Regiment; the 2nd Battalion, Canterbury Regiment; and the 2nd Battalion, Otago Regiment. This was later changed, though, when several battalions were swapped between the 1st and 2nd Brigades, resulting in the 1st Battalions of the Canterbury and Otago Regiments replacing the 2nd Battalions of the Auckland and Wellington Regiments. This placed all the North Island battalions in the 1st Brigade while all the South Island formations were in the 2nd Brigade.

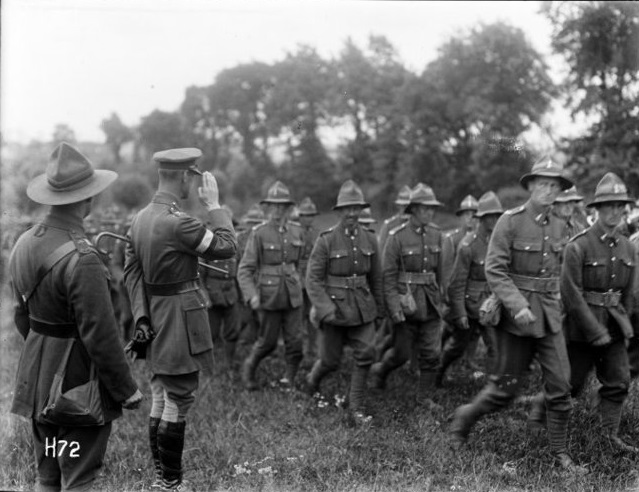
Lieutenant General Alexander Godley, commander of the NZEF, salutes marching soldiers of 2nd Infantry Brigade during a troop review after the Battle of Messines, Belgium

Brigadier General Herbert Hart took over as brigade commander in February 1918, after the 4th Brigade was disbanded due to manpower constraints. At this time, the 2nd Brigade received a large number of reinforcements from the 4th Brigade.

The brigade fought in several major engagements including the Battles of Broodseinde, Messines and Passchendaele. It was disbanded in early 1919 following the cessation of hostilities in Europe.

=== Territorial Force ===
There was also a formation in the New Zealand Territorial Force (TF) that from 1924 was designated 2nd Infantry Brigade until 1964 at which time it was disbanded (it was originally known as Wellington Infantry Brigade from 1910 to 1920 and then Central Infantry Brigade from 1921 to 1923). During the Second World War, this TF brigade was part of 4th Division and then 1st Division, both of which served on the Home Front in New Zealand.
