= Cecil J. Wray =

New Zealand sports administrator

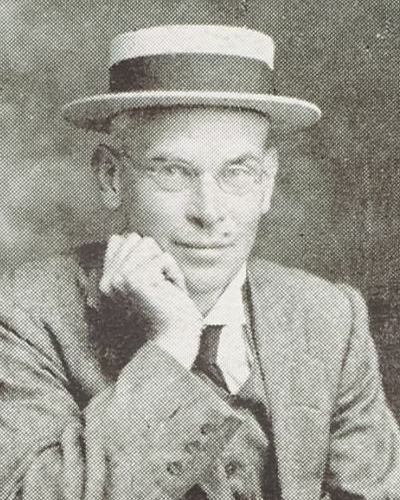
Cecil Wray

Cecil James Wray MBE (13 March 1868 – November 1955) was a New Zealand sports administrator, resident in England from 1913. He represented New Zealand on the International Olympic Committee from 1931 to 1934, and was on the Rugby Football Union in England for 25 years.

He was born in Pātea to Charles Allen Wray and Emily Wray, and attended Wanganui Collegiate School 1883–86. He was a rower, cricketer and rugby player.

After working as a bank clerk he qualified as a lawyer. He practised as a lawyer in Wanganui, and was on the Wanganui Borough Council until he moved to England. During World War I he entertained New Zealand soldiers on leave in England. In the 1919 King's Birthday Honours, Wray was appointed a Member of the Order of the British Empire, for services in connection with prisoners of war and the comfort of New Zealand troops in hospitals in the United Kingdom during the war. In 1935, he was awarded the King George V Silver Jubilee Medal.

Wray assisted William Pember Reeves in writing and revising The Long White Cloud (1898), a history of New Zealand.

Wray died in Bournemouth in November 1955.
