= William Garnett Braithwaite =

British Army general (1870–1937)

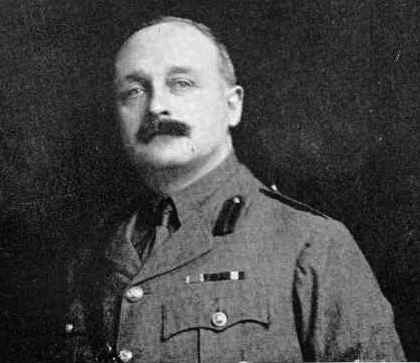
- Portrait of William Braithwaite, a lieutenant colonel at the time, circa 1911 to 1915
- Born: 21 October 1870; Kendal, Westmorland, England
- Died: 15 October 1937 (aged 66); Camberley, Surrey, England
- Military career
- Allegiance: United Kingdom; New Zealand
- Branch: British Army (1891–11, 1918–25); New Zealand Military Forces (1911–17)
- Service years: 1891–1925
- Rank: Brigadier General
- Commands: 3rd New Zealand (Rifle) Brigade; 2nd Infantry Brigade; New Zealand Division (acting); 16th Infantry Brigade
- Conflicts: Second Boer War; First World War; Gallipoli campaign; Western Front
- Awards: Companion of the Order of the Bath; Companion of the Order of St Michael and St George; Distinguished Service Order; Mentioned in despatches (9 times); Order of the White Eagle, 3rd Class (Serbia)

Brigadier General William Garnett Braithwaite, CB, CMG, DSO (21 October 1870 – 15 October 1937) was a British Army officer who participated in the Boer War and the First World War.

Born in England in 1870, he joined the British Army in 1891. He served with the Royal Welsh Fusiliers during the Boer War, during which he received the Distinguished Service Order. After the war he was an instructor at the Royal Military College. In 1911, he went to New Zealand on secondment to help with the training and administration of the New Zealand Military Forces. Following the outbreak of the First World War, he served as a staff officer in the New Zealand Expeditionary Force. He commanded the New Zealand Division's 2nd Infantry Brigade for nearly two years on the Western Front and on occasion was acting commander of the division. In December 1917, he was medically evacuated to England. After a period of rest, he returned to military duty with the British Army, and ended the war in command of the 16th Infantry Brigade. He retired from the army in 1925 and died in 1937 at the age of 66.

== Early life ==
Braithwaite was born in Kendal, Westmorland, England on 21 October 1870. After completing his schooling at Marlborough College, he attended the Royal Military College at Sandhurst before joining the British Army in 1891.

== Military career ==
Braithwaite was commissioned in the Royal Welsh Fusiliers as a second lieutenant 23 May 1891. On 2 March 1898 he succeeded Captain Arthur Lowry Cole as adjutant of his regiment.

From late 1899 to 1902, Braithwaite, having attained the rank of captain, fought in the Second Boer War. As well as being appointed to the Distinguished Service Order (DSO), he was mentioned in despatches three times for his service in South Africa. After the war, he was appointed adjutant of the 3rd (Volunteer) Battalion of his regiment. He was later seconded for service on the staff and was assigned to the Royal Military College for a period of time as an instructor.

In 1911, now a major, Braithwaite was seconded to the New Zealand Military Forces under the command of the then Major General Alexander Godley. Braithwaite was appointed General Staff Officer for the Auckland Military District and later promoted to temporary lieutenant colonel, Godley's Chief of General Staff. At the time, Godley was restructuring the New Zealand Military Forces and creating a Territorial Force to replace the inadequate Volunteer Force. Braithwaite assisted in the establishment of the Territorial Force and was responsible for staff organisation and training. His initial three-year appointment was to expire in July 1914 but earlier that year was extended a further 12 months following a request from the New Zealand government.

=== First World War ===
Braithwaite volunteered for the New Zealand Expeditionary Force (NZEF) following the outbreak of the First World War in August 1914. He left for the Middle East as the staff officer responsible for the operational planning of the NZEF. His wife, Gwendolen, whom he married in 1901 and the daughter of Edward Osborne Hewett, and the couple's three children also left New Zealand but to live in England.

==== Gallipoli Campaign ====
Following a period of training with the NZEF in Egypt, Braithwaite served as a staff officer in Godley's headquarters. Godley was not only commander of the NZEF but also the New Zealand and Australian Division during the Gallipoli Campaign which commenced in April 1915. Braithwaite fulfilled his duties well and was twice mentioned in despatches for his work during the August offensive. He took ill the next month and required evacuation for medical treatment. He returned to duty in October and the following month took over temporary command of the New Zealand Infantry Brigade when its nominal commander, Brigadier General Francis Johnston, went on sick leave. After the withdrawal of the Allied forces from Gallipoli, Braithwaite returned with the surviving elements of the NZEF to Egypt. He was appointed a Companion of the Order of St Michael and St George for his work during the Gallipoli Campaign.

In December 1915 Braithwaite was promoted temporary brigadier general (his temporary rank of lieutenant colonel was made substantive at the same time) and took command of the newly formed New Zealand (Rifle) Brigade. The brigade consisted of only two battalions at this stage but would be brought up to strength with the arrival of its 3rd and 4th Battalions in March 1916. During this time Braithwaite oversaw the training of his new command. However, within a few months, he was appointed commander of the 2nd Infantry Brigade, one of the three brigades of the newly formed New Zealand Division.

==== Western Front ====
The New Zealand Division moved to the Western Front in April 1916. Braithwaite had a brief period in command of the division while its commander, Major General Andrew Russell, was on leave. During the division's first major engagement, the Somme Offensive, Braithwaite led his brigade in the Battle of Flers-Courcelette in which it incurred over 700 casualties during the capture of its key objective, the Switch Line. A few days later he planned and directed a successful nighttime attempt by the strongest battalion of his brigade to seize the neighbouring high ground at what was known as Goose Alley. After the battle, Russell assessed Braithwaite as the best performed of his brigade commanders. He was subsequently awarded the Serbian Order of the White Eagle, 3rd Class.

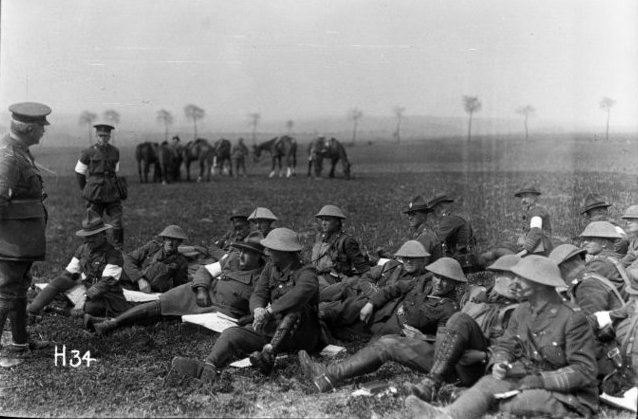
Brigadier General Braithwaite (far left) explains the plan for the upcoming Battle of Messines to New Zealand troops on a training exercise, 1917

On 3 June 1917, Braithwaite was promoted to brevet colonel, although he remained a temporary brigadier general. His brigade had a central role in the Battle of Messines and was able to achieve its objectives with minimal casualties. However, heavy losses were incurred by his brigade later in the year during the First Battle of Passchendaele on 12 October. After his initial attack faltered and came to a halt, Braithwaite protested orders from Russell later that day to resume the attack, 2nd Infantry Brigade having suffered heavy casualties for the gain of little ground. When it became apparent to Russell that flanking units had not achieved their objectives, the orders were cancelled.

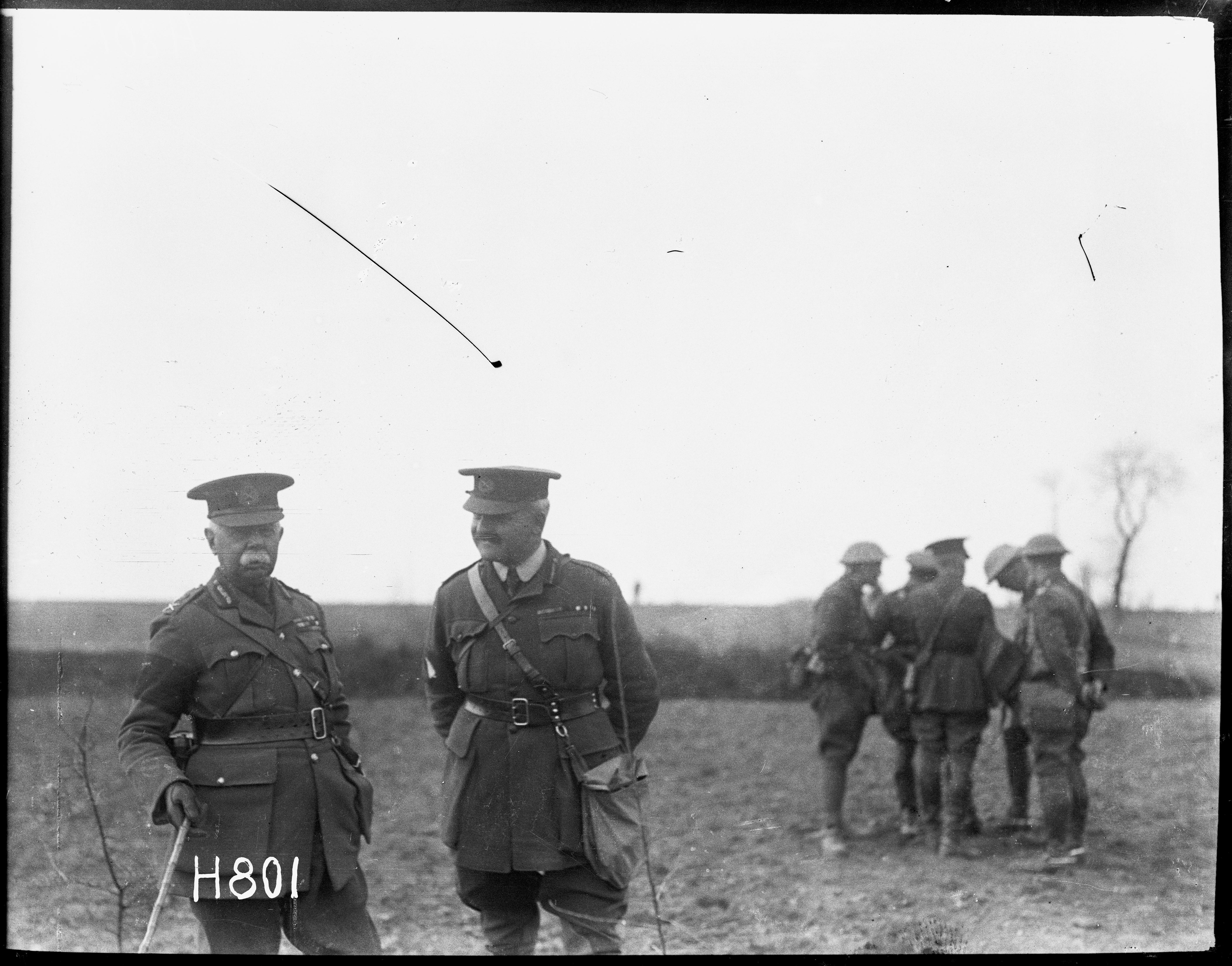
General Sir Herbert Plumer, commanding the British Second Army, and Brigadier General Braithwaite, in conversation at Bailleul, France, May 1917.

Braithwaite had a further period in command of the division while Russell was on sick leave in late October and in early December led his brigade in attacks on Polderhoek Chateau. The brigade suffered heavy losses and the attack was regarded as a failure. At this stage of the war, Braithwaite was one of the longest serving brigade commanders of the NZEF. Worn down by stresses of command, his health was so poor it forced his evacuation to England.

Following a period of convalescence, Braithwaite, rather than rejoining the New Zealand Division, resumed service in the British Army with his parent unit, the Royal Welsh Fusiliers. A popular commander amongst the New Zealanders, rumours circulated in the division that his return to the British Army was due to his refusal to continue with the 12 October 1917 attack at Passchendaele.

Braithwaite returned to the front in February 1918 as a brigadier general, general staff (BGGS) in a British corps and was made a Companion of the Order of the Bath in June. In October, he was placed in command of the 16th Infantry Brigade, part of the 6th Division, when its previous commander, Brigadier General Henry Alexander Walker, was wounded in an artillery barrage, and led it through to the armistice of 11 November 1918.

During the course of the First World War he had been mentioned in despatches six times.

== Later life ==
Braithwaite remained in the British Army after the war and commanded a brigade in the British Army of the Rhine. While stationed in Germany, he wrote a foreword for one of the regimental histories of the NZEF. He relinquished his temporary rank of brigadier general in 1920, and reverted to his substantive rank of colonel to take up a brigade command in the Territorial Force. He eventually retired from the British Army in November 1925, with the honorary rank of brigadier general. He died in Camberley, Surrey, on 15 October 1937, survived by his wife and children. Braithwaite Street in the Wellington suburb of Karori is named for him.
