= Thomas Pilcher =

British Army officer

Major-General Thomas Pilcher CB
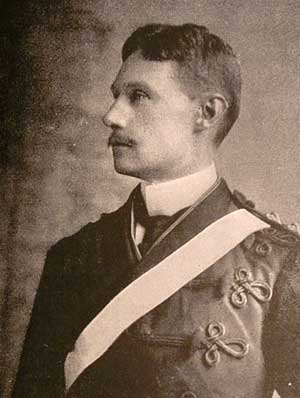
- Pilcher, photographed in South Africa, c. 1900
- Born: 8 July 1858
- Died: 14 December 1928 (aged 70)
- Military career
- Allegiance: United Kingdom
- Branch: British Army
- Rank: Major-General
- Commands: 2nd Bn Bedfordshire Regiment; Bangalore Brigade; Burma Division; 17th (Northern) Division
- Conflicts: Second Boer War; First World War

Major-General Thomas David Pilcher, CB (8 July 1858 – 14 December 1928) was a British Army officer, who commanded a mounted infantry unit in the Second Boer War and the 17th (Northern) Division during the First World War, before being removed from command in disgrace during the Battle of the Somme.

Pilcher spent his early career as an infantry officer, first seeing active service on colonial campaigns in Nigeria in the late 1890s followed by field command in the Second Boer War (1899–1902), on which he published a book of lessons learned in 1903. Following the war, he held a number of senior commands in India. However, further promotion was checked by his having come into conflict with his commander-in-chief, who regarded him as unsuited for senior command in part because of his writings; Pilcher was a keen student of the German army and its operational methods, and an active theorist who published a number of controversial books advocating the adoption of new military techniques as well as an anonymous invasion novel.

On the outbreak of the First World War he was on leave in England, and eventually obtained the command of 17th (Northern) Division, a New Army volunteer unit. The division supported the initial attacks at the Battle of the Somme in July 1916, where Pilcher again clashed with his superiors over his refusal to push on an attack without pausing for preparations, believing it would result in failure and heavy casualties. After ten days of fighting, Pilcher was sacked and sent to command a reserve centre in England. From here, he wrote a series of books before retiring in 1919. He ran as a parliamentary candidate for the splinter right-wing National Party in the 1918 general election, and continued a loose involvement with right-wing politics which extended to membership in the early British Fascisti.

Pilcher had married Kathleen Gonne, daughter of a cavalry officer, in 1889; the marriage was strained, partly through Pilcher's gambling habits and adultery, and partly through his dislike for Maud Gonne, Kathleen's sister and a prominent Irish nationalist. The couple divorced in 1911, having had four children; one would later become a High Court judge, while another died on the Western Front in 1915. Pilcher remarried in 1913, and remained married to his second wife Millicent until his death in 1928.

== Early life and military career ==
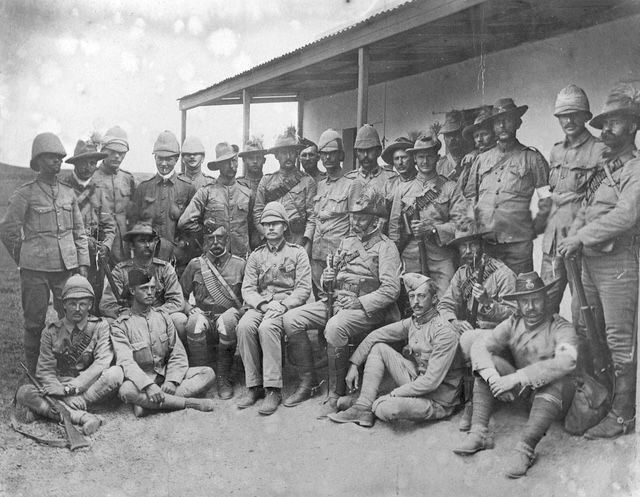
A group of British and Australian mounted infantry officers, circa 1900, including Pilcher (seated centre, with pith helmet).

Pilcher was born in Rome in 1858, the son of Thomas Webb Pilcher, of Harrow, and his wife, Sophia (née Robinson). He was the eldest of five children (four surviving infancy); his younger brother, Percy, would go on to become a pioneering aeronautical engineer, assisted by their sister Ella who undertook the fabric work on the aircraft's wings. Pilcher was educated at Harrow School, but after his father died in October 1874, he left the school the following year (aged 17). Following his father's death, in an attempt to save money on living expenses, his mother took the family to live in Celle, where she herself died in 1877. Thomas brought his three younger siblings home, and entered the British Army, commissioned as a second lieutenant in the Dublin City Artillery Militia in August 1878. Commissions in the Militia were often used as a stepping-stone to a commission in the Regular Army, and Pilcher rapidly transferred out, first to the 22nd Regiment of Foot (later the Cheshire Regiment) in June 1879, then almost immediately to the 5th Fusiliers (later the Northumberland Fusiliers and, much later still, the Royal Northumberland Fusiliers) in July.

After a period of regimental service, Pilcher attended the Staff College, Camberley, passing the course in 1892, and from 1895 to 1897 was appointed as the deputy assistant adjutant general (DAAG) for Dublin District. From here, he took a posting in colonial West Africa in the late 1890s, where he was involved in raising a battalion of the West African Frontier Force and commanded an expedition to Lapai and Argeyah. He had been promoted to temporary lieutenant colonel in November 1897.

In 1899 Pilcher, who in July was promoted to brevet lieutenant colonel, transferred regiments for the third time, this time to the Bedfordshire Regiment (later the Bedfordshire and Hertfordshire Regiment), where he took command of the regiment's 2nd Battalion. It served in the Second Boer War from 1899 to 1902, but in early 1900 Pilcher was seconded to the mounted infantry. In April 1900 he was appointed in command of the 3rd Corps of Mounted Infantry, including a large contingent of Australians, part of the 1st Mounted Infantry Brigade under overall command by Major General Edward Hutton. This brigade was part of a force taking part in Lord Roberts's advance from Bloemfontein and after the fall of Pretoria, and took part in the Battle of Diamond Hill (June 1900). He was promoted to lieutenant colonel on 20 October 1900, and to colonel on 29 November 1900, and in 1901 he was made an aide-de-camp to King Edward VII. During early 1902 he was stationed in the Orange River Colony, operating from Boshof, and later assisted in convoying supplies to garrisons west of Kimberley in Cape Colony.

== Interwar years ==
Following the end of the war, he returned to the United Kingdom in early June 1902. For his services during the war, he was appointed a Companion of the Order of the Bath (CB) on 29 November 1900, but was not invested until he was back in England, by King Edward VII at Buckingham Palace on 8 August 1902.

He commanded Regular brigades at Aldershot from 1902 to 1907, including the 3rd Brigade, part of the 2nd Division of the 1st Army Corps, in May 1904, for which he was promoted to substantive colonel and temporary brigadier general while employed in this role. He was promoted to major general in February 1907, while still commanding the brigade. From here, he was posted to India, where he held a variety of commands, including command of another brigade on 31 December 1907, culminating in that of the Burma Division, the senior military officer in the colony, from 1912 to 1914, taking over from Major General Edwin Alderson. From 1914 to 1928 he was colonel of the Bedfordshire Regiment. At the time of the outbreak of war, though still holding the Burmese posting, he was on leave in England.

== Personal life and writing ==
In 1889, Pilcher married Kathleen Mary Gonne, daughter of Colonel Thomas Gonne of the 17th Lancers; her sister, Maude Gonne, later became a prominent Irish nationalist and mother of the politician and Nobel laureate Seán MacBride, as well as a close associate and muse of W. B. Yeats. Pilcher disapproved of his sister-in-law, particularly after her marriage to John MacBride, and relations were frequently strained; however, the two sisters remained close. The couple would have a daughter, Thora, and three sons – Toby, Tommy, and Pat. The elder son, Sir Gonne Pilcher ("Toby", to his family), became a High Court judge, while Tommy would be killed at the Battle of Neuve Chapelle in 1915, aged 21.

Pilcher's marriage was not a happy one; a gambler and womaniser, he expected his independently wealthy wife to bail out his debts and turn a blind eye to his mistresses. The two gradually drifted into separate lives, and after finally confronted with an affair becoming public, Kathleen sued for divorce. The precipitating event was Pilcher having been named as co-respondent in a divorce suit; it was alleged that he had committed adultery with Millicent Knight-Bruce, the wife of Major James Knight-Bruce. The case dragged on through 1910, delayed by Pilcher's inability to return from India to attend the court. Pilcher did not contest his wife's suit, and his own divorce was granted in 1911; he married Millicent, now divorced, in 1913.

Pilcher was a particularly active observer of the German army, studying their military methods and attending German army manoeuvres. He would later publish a translation of Clausewitz. His writing was sometimes controversial, beginning with the 1896 Artillery from an Infantry Officer's Point of View, in which he argued strongly in favour of adopting indirect fire techniques from concealed locations. Conventional doctrine held that artillery should be used to fire directly on its targets, as much from principle as from practical effect, with one prominent artillerist arguing that "firing from cover ... will destroy the whole spirit of the arm". The argument ran for two years. As well as provoking debate, his writing proved problematic for his career; in part because of a 1907 pamphlet, Fire Problems, he was twice blocked for promotion by the Commander-in-Chief India. In it, he had encouraged the development of machine-gun tactics, and much heavier concentration and use of the weapons, an unusual position for the pre-war period.

In 1906, Pilcher had also published an anonymous invasion novel, The Writing on the Wall, which described a German invasion of Britain; The war he theorised was an invasion by Germany followed by a rapid collapse of the British forces, particularly the volunteers, which he saw as unfit for purpose; he advocated a form of conscription and a mandatory reserve system to strengthen the Army. The Spectator was dismissive, comparing the novel unfavourably to The Invasion of 1910 ("many useful hints are given as to practical lessons ... [but] the general plot entirely destroys any value it might otherwise possess") and noting that the suggestions were "highly typical", but that it was counterproductive to simply malign the Army and encourage the country to adopt German military policies. It was translated and published in Germany the same year, as Mene Mene Tekel Upharsin: Englands überwältigung durch Deutschland.

== First World War ==
At the outbreak of the First World War in August 1914 Pilcher was on leave in England, and offered his services to the War Office, but was initially turned down as unsuitable for command by the commander-in-chief (C-in-C) of the British Expeditionary Force (BEF), Field Marshal Sir John French; however, in January 1915, he was appointed as general officer commanding (GOC) of the newly formed 17th (Northern) Division, a New Army formation predominantly drawn from civilian volunteers from Northern England.

The division moved to France in July 1915, where it held a sector near Ypres for the remainder of the year. It fought the Actions of St Eloi Craters in March 1916, following which General Sir Douglas Haig, who had succeeded French in command of the BEF, considered relieving Pilcher of his command – he was not highly rated by his superior officers – but in the end his corps commander, Lieutenant General Hew Dalrymple Fanshawe, GOC of V Corps, was sacked instead. Pilcher was perceived by many as old-fashioned and disengaged, rarely visiting the trenches; the journalist Philip Gibbs remarked on his "courteous old-fashioned dignity and gentleness of manner", but concluded simply that "modern warfare was too brutal for him". Pilcher's command was certainly slack; an observer in the summer of 1916, recently appointed to the 17th Division as a staff officer, recalled finding a completely disorganised unit, with no central co-ordination, no effective provision of laundry or comforts for front-line units, and described the divisional staff as simply "of no value".

The 17th was deployed for the Battle of the Somme in July. It was engaged on the first day of the Somme, 1 July, where it supported the capture of Fricourt and lost 1,155 men killed or wounded. Following this, it was involved in the capture of Contalmaison and the capture of Mametz, and had taken a total of 4,771 casualties by the time it was relieved on 11 July. Many of these casualties stemmed from an unsuccessful attack on the "Quadrangle Trench Support" on 7 July; the division had captured the main trench system on 5 July and Pilcher ordered it to pause and prepare for a subsequent assault. However, he was over-ruled by higher command, who forced an attack the next night – which failed – followed by a daylight attack on 7 July, which Pilcher strongly protested but eventually acquiesced in. He ordered an attack with the minimal number of men necessary, assuming it would inevitably be doomed to failure and high casualties, which outraged his superiors. Pilcher later wrote that:

It is very easy to sit a few miles in the rear and get credit for allowing men to be killed in an undertaking foredoomed to failure, but the part did not appeal to me and my protests against these useless attacks were not well received.

Following the division's withdrawal, Pilcher was promptly sacked by his corps commander, Lieutenant General Henry Horne, GOC XV Corps, along with the commander of the neighbouring 38th (Welsh) Division; Horne considered him lacking in "initiative, drive, and readiness", while Haig simply dismissed him as "unequal to the task" of divisional command. Pilcher was succeeded by the much younger Brigadier General Philip Robertson, an experienced battalion and brigade commander, on 13 July.

He was later appointed to command the Eastern Reserve Centre at St. Albans, in September, and retired from the army in January 1919, by which time the war was over.

== Later life ==
Following the end of the war, Pilcher contested the seat of Thornbury in the 1918 general election. He opposed the sitting Liberal member Athelstan Rendall, a Coalition Coupon candidate, representing the splinter right-wing National Party of Conservatives opposed to the Coalition. He was heavily defeated, taking only 38% of the vote in what had previously been a relatively close seat. He continued a loose association with right-wing politics, chairing the anti-Bolshevik National Security Union, and joining the anti-socialist and protectionist British Commonwealth Union. When the British Fascisti was formed in the early 1920s, Pilcher became a member and an official of its London branch.

Pilcher died in 1928, aged 70, of pneumonia. He was survived by his second wife.

== Publications ==
Pilcher published a number of books through his career:

- Manœuvre block (1895)
- Artillery from an Infantry Officer's Point of View (1896[?])
- Some Lessons from the Boer War, 1899–1902 (1903) – digital copy
- Some considerations connected with the formations of infantry in attack and defence (1906)
- The writing on the wall [published anonymously as "General Staff"] (1906)
- Fire problems (1912)
- A general's letters to his son on obtaining his commission [published anonymously] (1917) – digital copy
- A General's letters to his son on minor tactics [published anonymously as "X. Y. Z."] (1918) – digital copy
- War according to Clausewitz [edited, with commentary] (1918)
- East is East: stories of Indian life (1922) – digital copy

Military offices
| Preceded by ? | GOC Burma Division; 1912–1914 | Succeeded by ? |
| Preceded by Walter Kenyon-Slaney | GOC 17th (Northern) Division; 1915–1916 | Succeeded by Philip Robertson |
