= Capture of Fricourt =

1916 WWI event in the Battle of the Somme

- Part of The Battle of the Somme, First World War
- Battle of the Somme 1 July – 18 November 1916
Date	1–2 July 1916
Location	Fricourt, Picardy, France 49°59′56″N 02°42′57″E
Result	British victory

Belligerents
British Empire: Bermuda; United Kingdom of Great Britain and Ireland	German Empire: Baden; Prussia; Württemberg

Commanders and leaders
(United Kingdom of Great Britain and Ireland) Douglas Haig (United Kingdom of Great Britain and Ireland) Henry Rawlinson (United Kingdom of Great Britain and Ireland) Henry Horne	(German Empire) Fritz von Below (German Empire) (Kingdom of Prussia) Hermann von Stein

Strength
3 brigades from 3 divisions	2 regiments, 1 battalion

Casualties and losses
8,791	2,104 (1,625 prisoners) from one regiment
- A contingent of the Bermuda Volunteer Rifle Corps was attached to a 21st Division battalion.
- Fricourt, a commune in the department Somme in Picardy, northern France

Fricourt is a village that was fought over in July 1916, during the Battle of the Somme, which took place in France during the First World War. Fricourt is 3 mi (4.8 km) from Albert, north of Bray and west of Mametz, near the D 938 road and at the junction of the D 147 with the D 64. The village is 20 mi (32 km) north-east of Amiens and on the route of the Albert–Péronne light railway. Fricourt Wood was north-east of the village, with a château on the edge of the village and a number of craters, known as the Tambour (Kniewerk to the Germans) on the west side. Fricourt formed a salient in the German front-line and was the principal German fortified village between the River Somme and the Ancre.

The ground sloped south-west from Bazentin ridge, divided by Willow Stream, which rose in Trônes Wood and flowed past the ends of the Mametz and Fricourt spurs. The stream was the inner boundary of the 7th Division on the right and the 21st Division on the left, of the XV Corps. German fortification of the area around Mametz and Fricourt had created a web of trenches 1,200 yd (1,100 m) deep behind the front-line trench, which was irregular, making many angles from which an attacker could be engaged.

On 24 June 1916, the artillery preparation began for the Anglo-French offensive; the Fricourt area was subjected to several British gas attacks during the bombardment. Several mines were detonated just before 7:30 a.m. on 1 July, when British infantry attack on the German defences either side of the village began. By the end of 1 July, the village had been enveloped on three sides and during the night, the German garrison withdrew towards the second position. British patrols reported the retirement overnight and at noon on 2 July, troops of the 17th (Northern) Division occupied the village and captured Fricourt Wood in the mid-afternoon.

The 28th Baden Reserve Division, which held the front from Montauban to Fricourt and Ovillers, was saved from destruction by reinforcements from the 10th Bavarian Division. The 3rd Guard Division was hurried forward from Valenciennes, to hold the ground in front of the second position and British attacks began on Shelter and Bottom woods up the slope towards Contalmaison. XV Corps suffered more than 8,000 casualties on 1 July, of which the 10th Battalion West Yorkshire Regiment suffered 733 losses, the worst of the battalions engaged on the first day; XV Corps took c. 1,600 prisoners.

== Background ==
=== Strategic developments ===
The German army arrived at Fricourt on 29 September 1914, when the 26th (Württemberg) Reserve Division and the 28th (Baden) Reserve Division of the XIV Reserve Corps, tried to continue an advance westwards towards Amiens. By 7 October, temporary scrapes had been occupied, after a night attack turned into a fiasco and 400 German soldiers were captured. Fighting in the area from the Somme north to the Ancre, subsided into minor line-straightening attacks by both sides. In December the French attacked all along the new Western Front, which around Fricourt from 17–21 December, cost both sides thousands of casualties. In 1915 the war around the village went underground, with mining and counter-mining. In the village of La Boisselle, just north of Fricourt, 61 mines were blown between April 1915 and January 1916. At the end of July 1915, fresh troops were observed moving into the French positions north of the Somme and were identified on 1 August, at Thiepval Wood as British soldiers ("dressed in brown suits").

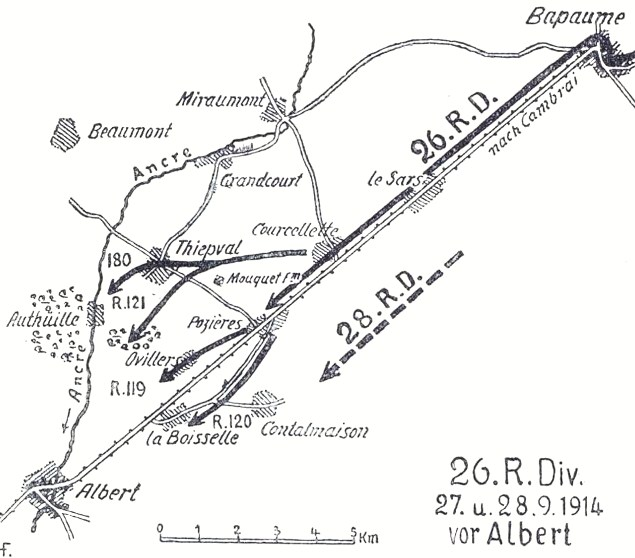
Diagram of the 26th (Württemberg) Reserve Division and the 28th (Baden) Reserve Division attacks towards Albert, late September 1914

In January 1915, Erich von Falkenhayn, the German Chief of the General Staff (Oberste Heeresleitung) issued instructions on defensive policy, which required the existing front line to be made capable of being easily defended by small numbers of troops. Positions lost in the front line were to be recaptured by counter-attack and a second trench was to be built behind the front trench to shelter the front garrison during bombardments. To evade shellfire on the area behind the front line, communication trenches were to be dug, through which the troops in the second trench could move forward. Behind the front position, a new position was to be dug beyond enemy field-artillery range, to hold up an attack which had broken through the first line, while a counter-attack was mounted. A new line could be formed and linked to the occupied flanks of the first position, restricting an attacker to a bend in the line, rather than a breakthrough if counter-attacks failed. Construction of these defences took much of 1915 and since the front line was to be held at all costs, the forward position was completed first. On 6 May, another defensive position was ordered to be built 2,000–3,000 yd (1.1–1.7 mi; 1.8–2.7 km) behind the front line.

In July 1915, Joseph Joffre the head of Grand Quartier Général (Commander in Chief of the French Army) held the first inter-Allied conference at Chantilly and in December 1915, a second conference resolved to conduct simultaneous attacks by the French, Russian, British and Italian armies. For the British, Flanders was the main theatre of operations but in February 1916, Haig accepted Joffre's plan for a combined attack astride the Somme river to begin around 1 July; in April the British Cabinet accepted the necessity of an offensive in France. The nature of a joint offensive on the Somme began to change almost immediately, when the German army began the Battle of Verdun on 21 February. In March, Ferdinand Foch had proposed an offensive on a 28 mi (45 km) front between Lassigny and the Somme and a British attack on a 16 mi (25 km) front from the Somme to Thiepval, with 42 French and 25 British divisions. French divisions intended for the joint offensive were diverted to Verdun and the offensive was eventually reduced to a main effort by the British, with a supporting attack by one French army. British planning for the offensive began in April, with a Fourth Army proposal for a methodical advance to the high ground around Thiepval, thence to the Bapaume–Péronne road. Haig rejected the concept and required the British objective on the Somme to be the capture of the ridge north of Péronne, to assist the French to cross the Somme further south. Diversion of French divisions to Verdun and the assumption by the British of the main role in the Somme offensive led to revisions of the plan towards a more ambitious attempt at strategic attrition, by a breakthrough and a battle of manoeuvre with distant objectives.

=== Tactical developments ===
==== 1915 ====
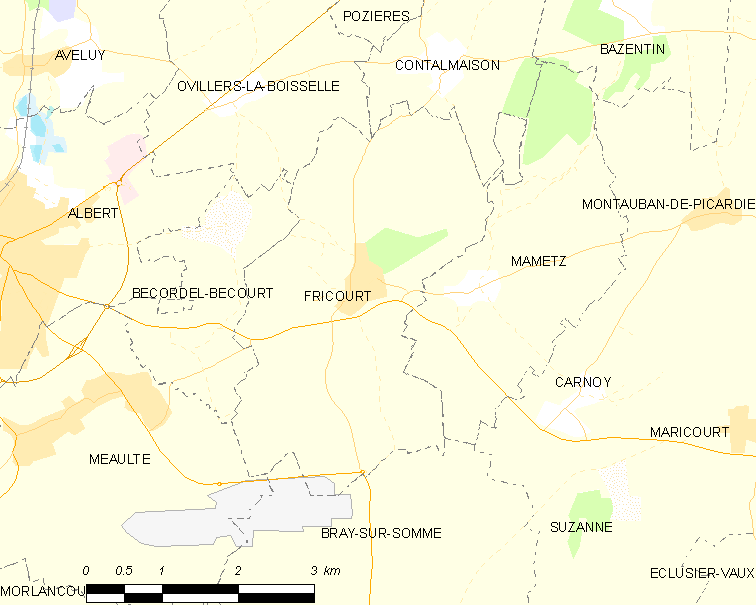
Map of Fricourt and vicinity (commune FR insee code 80366)

In January 1915, General Erich von Falkenhayn the German Chief of the General Staff (Oberste Heeresleitung, OHL), ordered a reconstruction of the defences which had been improvised when mobile warfare ended on the Western Front, late in 1914. Barbed wire obstacles were enlarged from one belt 5–10 yd (4.6–9.1 m) wide to two belts 30 yd (27 m) wide, about 15 yd (14 m) apart. Double and triple thickness wire was used and laid 3–5 ft (0.91–1.52 m) high. The front line had been increased from one trench line to a front position with three trenches 150–200 yd (140–180 m) apart, the first trench (Kampfgraben) occupied by sentry groups, the second (Wohngraben) for the bulk of the front-trench garrison and the third trench for local reserves. The trenches were traversed and had sentry-posts in concrete recesses built into the parapet. Dugouts had been deepened from 6–9 ft (1.8–2.7 m) to 20–30 ft (6.1–9.1 m), 50 yd (46 m) apart and large enough for 25 men. An intermediate line of strong points (the Stützpunktlinie) about 1,000 yd (910 m) behind the front line was also built.

Communication trenches ran back to the reserve position, renamed the second position, which was as well built and wired as the front position. The second position was sited beyond the range of Allied field artillery, to force an attacker to stop and move guns forward before assaulting it. The French Second Army had fought the Battle of Hébuterne (7–13 June) on a 1.2 mi (1.9 km) front at Toutvent Farm, to the west of Serre, against a salient held by the 52nd Division and gained 3,000 ft (900 m) on a 1.2 mi (2 km) front, at a cost of 10,351 casualties, 1,760 being killed against a German loss of c. 4,000 men. The building of a third position, another 3,000 yd (1.7 mi; 2.7 km) further back, had begun in February 1916. In the first half of 1916, as signs of an Anglo-French offensive on the Somme multiplied, more defensive works were built all over the Somme front and raiding was increased to snatch prisoners for questioning. In late May 1916, a spoiling attack was planned from Foucaucourt, south of the Somme, to St Pierre Divion north of the river, intended to reach a depth of 16 mi (25 km). The plan was cancelled on 4 June, when the forces to carry it out were sent to Russia to counter the Brusilov Offensive.

==== 1916 ====
The British method of attack by 1916 was to fire an intense bombardment on the German front trenches just before zero hour, then lift the bombardment to the next trench, then the next according to a timetable. Before the barrage lifted, infantry were to creep as close as possible to the bombardment, considered to be 100 yd (91 m) from the trench and to attack as soon as the shellfire lifted. The destructive effect of the bombardment was said by Haig and Rawlinson, to be such that nothing could live in the target area and that infantry would only have to occupy the ground,

Much the same had been said by the commander of the German 5th Army before the assault on Verdun.

— James Edmonds, British official historian

It was recommended that the infantry should attack from trenches no further than 200 yd (180 m) from the German front line. The digging of such trenches was opposed by some divisional commanders, lest it alerted the defenders and the decision was left to the discretion of corps and divisional commanders. Some divisions dug advanced trenches but most expected to begin the advance across no man's land covered by the barrage. In the XV Corps area, both divisions were to attack behind a creeping barrage, some starting from support trenches behind the British front line, due damage caused by German artillery-fire and mining and some from no man's land, after crawling forward just before the end of the bombardment.

== Prelude ==
=== British offensive preparations ===
XV Corps (Lieutenant-General Henry Horne) with the 7th, 21st and 17th (Northern) divisions, five artillery groups and a siege battery, on a front of 5,000 yd (2.8 mi; 4.6 km), about one heavy gun every 58 yd (53 m) and one field gun per 25 yd (23 m). (Note: Sixteen 4.7-inch, twenty 60-pounder and four 6-inch guns, twelve 6-inch, twelve 8-inch, twelve 9.2-inch and two 12-inch howitzers. A 4.5-inch howitzer battery and the French 6th Field Artillery Group were also attached.) The infantry attack was to be made behind a creeping barrage, in which the 18-pounders would slowly move their fire beyond the German front trench, at 50 yd (46 m) intervals, as the heavy artillery lifted from objective to objective when the creeping barrage reached it. If infantry caught up with the creeping barrage, they were to take cover and attack when the barrage moved forward. Air co-operation for XV Corps was to come from 3 Squadron and 9 Squadron Royal Flying Corps (RFC).

=== British plan of attack ===
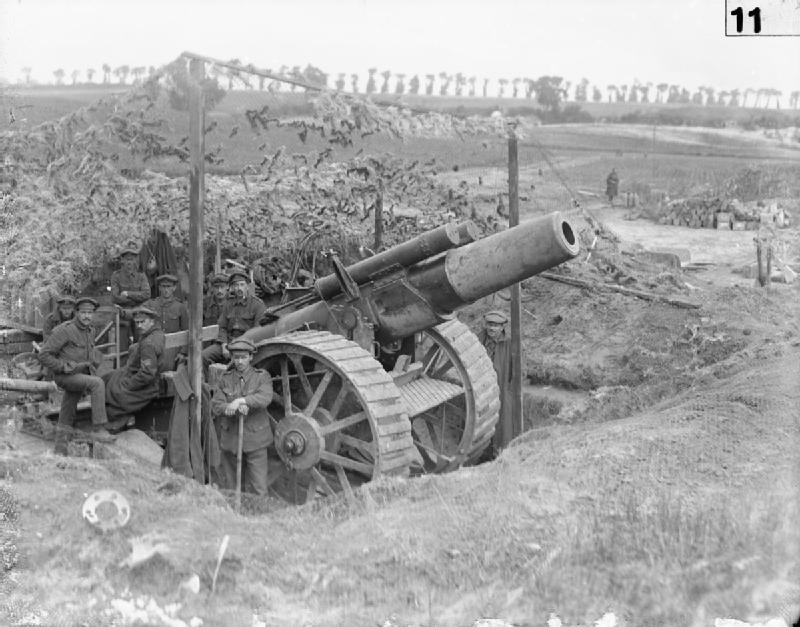
8-inch Howitzer, Somme 1 July 1916

In the first stage of the corps plan, the divisions were to occupy higher ground either side of Willow Stream and beyond Mametz on the right, then take Fricourt in the next stage, moving through the first German intermediate position, to the second intermediate position across the valley fronting Mametz Wood. The right was to gain contact with the XIII Corps at White Trench and the left link with III Corps at Quadrangle Trench, below Contalmaison. The final objective was chosen to receive a counter-attack, with good artillery observation in front of dead ground, from which the artillery could bombard the German second position.

If the German defence collapsed, the 17th (Northern) Division, in corps reserve, would pass through and advance beyond Mametz Wood, up the north side of Caterpillar Valley, to Bazentin le Grand, Longueval and Ginchy. Fricourt was not to be attacked frontally but isolated, for which the right hand brigade of the 7th Division was to take Mametz and then White Trench, the centre brigade was to form a defensive flank on the south rise of Willow Valley, which faced Fricourt and Fricourt Wood to the north. The inner brigades of the 7th Division and 21st Division were to wait in the front-line trenches opposite the village, until ordered forward by the corps commander.

At 6:25 a.m. an intensive bombardment was to begin and from 7:15–7:25 a.m., gas was to be released at the centre of the front opposite Fricourt. At 7:22 a.m. a hurricane bombardment from Stokes mortars was to begin and at 7:26 a.m. a smoke-screen would be generated to screen the inner flanks of the 7th and 21st divisions and cloud the German support line opposite the 7th Division. Three mines, part of the Mines on the first day of the Somme, of 25,000 lb (11 long tons; 11 t), 15,000 lb (6.7 long tons; 6.8 t) and 9,000 lb (4.0 long tons; 4.1 t) were to be blown at 7:28 a.m. under the Tambour, to create crater lips to protect the 21st Division infantry from machine-guns at German Tambour. Bulgar Point near Mametz was mined with a 2,000 lb (0.89 long tons; 0.91 t) charge, a sap further west mined with a 200 lb (91 kg) charge and four 500 lb (230 kg) mines were planted south of Hidden Wood.

=== German defensive preparations ===
The 28th Reserve Division faced XV Corps with I and III Battalions, Reserve Infantry Regiment 109, which had 15 machine-guns in shell-hole positions and the II Battalion in reserve, opposite the British 7th Division. The regiment was due for relief on the night of 30 June – 1 July but the extent of British artillery-fire kept Infantry Regiment 23 back near Montauban. Deep dugouts had been built in the front line but few had been dug further back, which led to the trench garrison being crowded in the first trench. The divisional artillery, an essential part of the defence plan, was smashed by British artillery-fire. Reserve Infantry Regiment 111 held the sector opposite the British 21st Division.

== Battle ==
=== Fourth Army ===
==== 7th Division ====
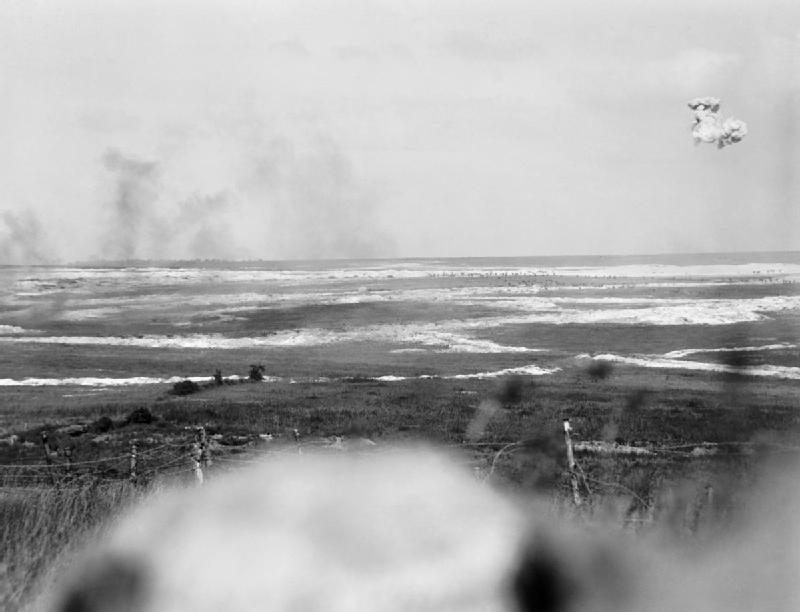
7th Division advance on the Somme, 1 July 1916 (IWM Q 89)

The right and centre brigades of the division attacked on a 1,800 yd (1,600 m) front from the Carnoy–Mametz track to a quarry near Hidden Wood. The 20th Brigade in the centre was to wheel left to form a line, from the north-west corner of Mametz to the south-west along Orchard Alley, across the Maricourt road, with the left near Bois Français, linking with the 22nd Brigade, which waited for the order to advance. The right-hand battalion of the 20th Brigade advanced from an area 250 yd (230 m) behind the front line, due to damage in the front line trenches and was devastated in no man's land by machine-gun fire from Fricourt Wood and the German support trench. The bombardment of Fricourt failed due to the 9.2-inch howitzer shell fuzes falling out before the shells reached the target. The survivors pressed on and entered the front trench south of Fricourt, some parties reaching the support trench, 250 yd (230 m) further on and overpowered the German troops in adjacent communication trenches.

Advancing further was impossible but the battalion continued to snipe and bomb the Germans opposite, as the flanking battalions advanced. Reinforcements later in the morning were also caught by machine-gun fire in no man's land and the survivors were unable to make progress beyond the existing 20th Brigade position. The left-hand battalion crossed no man's land with far fewer casualties and wheeled left to Hidden Lane, beyond Hidden Wood and short of Apple Alley, up the slope. Small parties mopped up German troops among the craters and mineshafts in the area, taking Hidden Lane by 9:30 a.m., despite losses from German troops in Mametz and Hidden Wood. The wood was captured by a frontal attack, combined with bombers moving down Hidden Lane, before parties advanced to the objective at Apple Alley. Establishment of the defensive flank towards Fricourt was not possible but the 22nd Brigade managed to occupy the German front and support trenches near the village and gain touch with the 20th brigade.

==== 21st Division ====
The division attacked with the 50th Brigade (attached from the 17th (Northern) Division) on the right and the 63rd and 64th brigades to the left, with the 62nd Brigade in reserve. The 50th Brigade was to be ready to attack Fricourt, if the enveloping attacks on the flanks failed, except for the left-hand battalion, which was to attack to form a defensive flank facing the village. The 21st Division brigades were to advance to the first objective at Crucifix Trench, the German intermediate line, then continue to the second objective at Bottom Wood and Quadrangle Trench, in the second German intermediate line, to link with troops from the 7th Division. The 10th Battalion, West Yorkshire Regiment, attacked on a front of 600 yd (550 m); the first two companies reached the German front trench with few casualties, then pressed on to Red Cottage at the north end of Fricourt. The rest of the battalion was caught by machine-guns in the village and at German Tambour, which had survived the mine explosions and were forward of the creeping barrage. The two companies were practically annihilated and only a few troops reached the front trench. The companies at Red Cottage were overrun later in the morning, only a few groups managing to reach the 63rd Brigade to the north. The companies in no man's land were pinned down until dark and the battalion lost 710 casualties, the worst battalion loss of 1 July.

The two 21st Division brigades had to move up the west slope of the Fricourt spur and advance across the dip and the first Fricourt–Contalmaison road to the first objective at Crucifix Trench, on the east slope of the spur. The right flank was to advance to Fricourt Farm and the left to Round Wood, south of Scots Redoubt. Half of the right flank battalion of the 63rd Brigade tried to advance five minutes before zero hour, crawling across no man's land but were forced back by machine-gun fire. The survivors of the attack formed one line to advance again at zero and were swept by fire from six machine-guns before reaching the German support trench; forty survivors then followed the barrage to the Sunken Road. The two support companies were also caught in no man's land and only 104 men reached the front trench, where the troops consolidated and defeated three counter-attacks from Fricourt. The left-hand battalion also tried to creep into no man's land and was fired on but continued to advance and the survivors reached the front trench, preceded by a shower of grenades and bombed forward to the support trench.

The supporting battalions were to advance at 8:30 a.m. to pass through to the second objective, when the creeping barrage moved on but the German opposition to the leading battalions, led to the support battalions being sent to reinforce the first objective at 8:40 a.m. Despite machine-gun fire sweeping no man's land, the survivors reached the top of Fricourt spur, on the right flank reaching the Sunken Road where a standing barrage was falling, before being stopped by machine-gun fire from Fricourt and the wood on the right. The left battalion reached the leading troops and bombed along communication trenches, occupying Lozenge Alley up to the Sunken Road to secure their right flank. Other parties advanced up the road to Crucifix Trench and more probed towards Fricourt Farm before retiring. German bombers counter-attacked towards Sunken Road but were repulsed and the British built a strong point in Lonely Trench. Accompanying Royal Engineers, intended to build more posts, were pressed into service as infantry, to hold the right flank of the brigade.

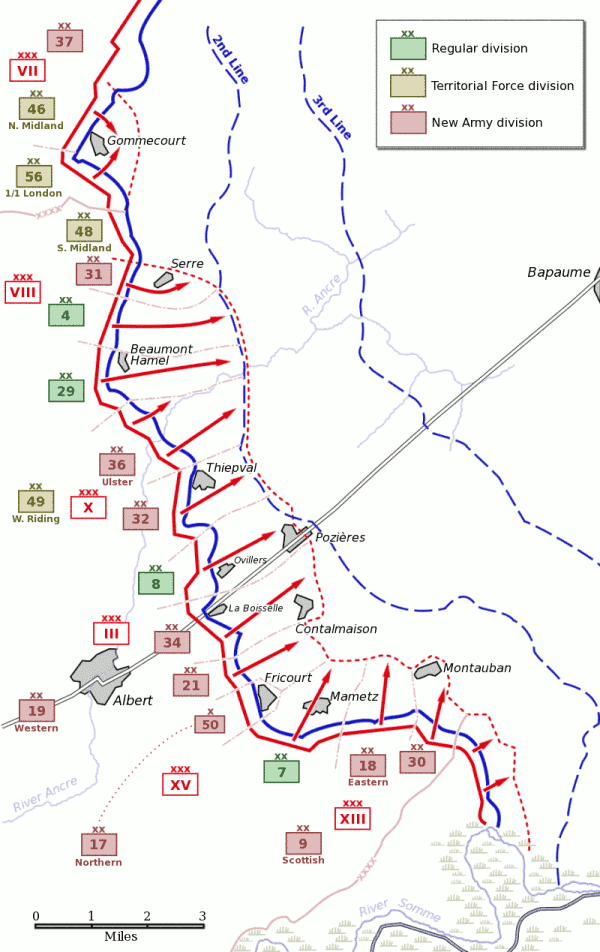
Anglo-French objectives, north bank of the Somme, 1 July 1916

The 64th Brigade front had a small salient at each end, between which a Russian sap had secretly been dug. The sap was exposed just before the attack, so that the British troops could attack in a straight line from the far side of the wire. During the intense bombardment in the last five minutes before zero hour, companies of the two leading battalions crept forward from the sap, as German machine-gunners ignored the bombardment, setting up their guns on the parapet; machine-gunners on higher ground near La Boisselle, swept no man's land and the ground behind the German front trench. When the hurricane bombardment stopped, the men of the battalions stood up and advanced through the German wire despite many casualties and took the trench, as German troops showered them with stick-grenades. The two supporting battalions followed close behind and all four rushed the German support trench and took 200 prisoners in ten minutes, half of both leading battalions becoming casualties. The advance continued when the creeping barrage moved on, across the top of the spur towards Sunken Road, as German parties and the leading troops engaged with bombs and bayonets.

The Sunken Road was reached at 8:00 a.m., after crossing 1 mi (1.6 km) of open ground. A halt was called but some troops pressed on to Crucifix Trench and took prisoner 100 Germans from Shelter Wood. Fire from Fricourt Wood, Shelter Wood and Birch Tree Wood made an advance to the second objective impractical, as the creeping barrage had moved on. The brigade commander went forward and placed troops on the open left flank, where the 34th Division, III Corps, was to have reached. More troops were sent forward to Crucifix Trench and Lewis-gunners sent to Lozenge Wood to the south. Brigadier-General Cuthbert Headlam led an attack on Round Wood to the north but most of the attackers were hit by machine-gun fire from the wood. A post was formed at the junction of Crucifix Trench and the Sunken Road and the wood was occupied at 9:45 a.m., when the garrison left the wood to counter-attack troops from the 34th Division, who had lost direction and approached the wood from the west. The existing positions were consolidated; Headlam returned to divisional headquarters by 11:00 a.m. and obtained two battalions from the reserve brigade. The reinforcements struggled through congested trenches and eventually took over the right of the 63rd Brigade and left of the 64th Brigade.

==== Fricourt ====
At midday, XV Corps headquarters had gained an exaggerated view of the success of the offensive; XIII Corps on the right had reported that the Germans were retreating towards Bazentin le Grand and III Corps had announced that its troops were advancing towards Contalmaison. Air observers reported that German artillery was withdrawing along the Albert–Bapaume road and that British infantry had been seen between Fricourt and Contalmaison. Air observers also saw flares lit by British troops below, which were reported promptly. On the right of XV Corps, Number 3 Kite Balloon Section was able to order a bombardment on a party of Germans who had counter-attacked Danzig Alley. The artillery was so effective that a renewed British attack took it easily. Horne ordered the third phase to commence, unaware that not all of the first phase objectives had been reached and set zero hour for 2:30 p.m., after a thirty-minute bombardment. The 22nd Brigade of the 7th Division, waiting south of Fricourt, attacked with 1 1/2 battalions and the leading companies got across no man's land with few losses. The support companies were caught by machine-gun fire from the left, the detachments intended to bomb down communication trenches to Willow Valley and Fricourt, being nearly annihilated. A small party reached the Rectangle, was bombed back to the support trench and all attempts to press forward again were met with more machine-gun fire from the left; an attempt to bomb forward along trenches also failed. The left-hand battalion bombed up Sunken Road Trench and both sides of the Rectangle to Apple Alley and briefly gained a foothold in Fricourt, which distracted the German defenders on the right, where touch was also gained with the 20th Brigade troops in Apple Alley.

The 50th Brigade attacked north of the Willow Stream, the plan being changed after the 10th West Yorkshire were destroyed in the morning. The right-hand battalion attacked at 2:30 p.m., after protesting that the attack would fail unless the objective attacked earlier by the 10th West Yorkshire was taken first. The second stage was ordered despite the failure of the first stage, against the most fortified part of the Fricourt defences, between Wing Corner below the southern tip of the village and German Tambour in front of the western face. The preliminary bombardment failed to cut the wire, due to faulty fuzes and only small gaps were made, the German dugouts in the area were found untouched. The battalion was engaged from both flanks as soon as it advanced, despite covering fire from Lewis guns on the railway embankment nearby. In three minutes 351 casualties had been inflicted, some German troops standing on the parapet to fire. A small number of British troops reached the village and were overrun and killed or captured, except for one party which occupied a cellar. The survivors in no man's land were pinned down until dark and a support battalion which followed the advance was also cut down in no man's land; the 50th Brigade attack was suspended.

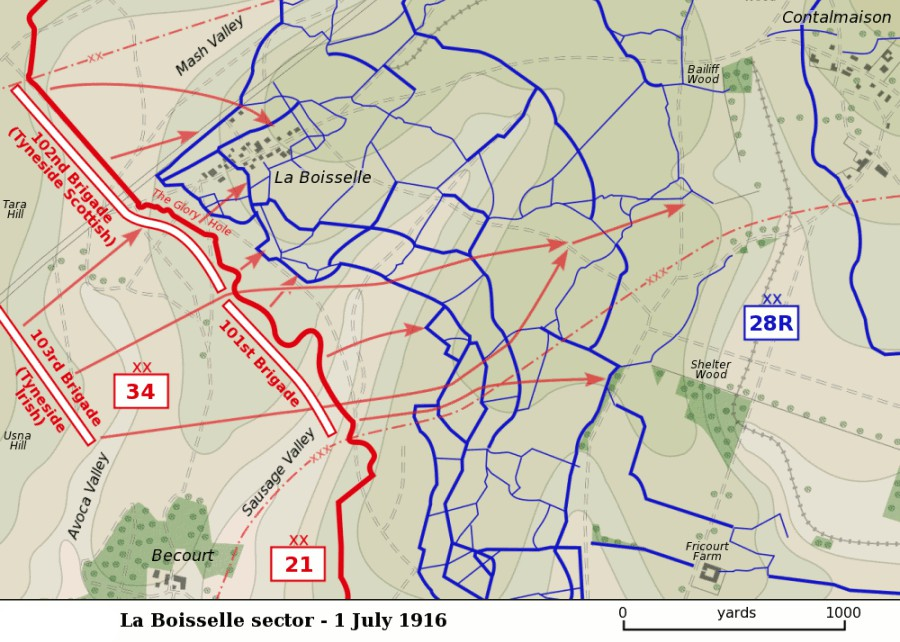
Northern flank of the 21st Division, Somme 1 July 1916

As the third phase attack by the centre brigades collapsed, the outer brigades of both divisions consolidated their hold on Mametz and Fricourt spurs. On the 7th Division front, the last company of the right-hand battalion of the 20th Brigade, advanced at 1:00 p.m. and despite being caught by machine-gun fire from the Shrine, arrived in time to exploit the attack on Fricourt at 2:30 p.m. The 20th Brigade was reinforced by part of a supporting battalion, to attack through Mametz towards Bunny Trench, past troops who had already worked forward into the east end of the village. Four lines advanced at 3:30 p.m., after a 30-minute bombardment. As they approached the village, about 200 German troops emerged from dugouts at the Shrine and Mametz to surrender and after a last stand by the garrison, the village was occupied by 4:05 p.m. The troops reached Bunny Trench, to complete the first phase of the 20th Brigade plan. From the centre of the divisional front facing Fricourt, the line ran from the north-west corner of Mametz, left to the slope along Orchard Alley, across the Péronne road and light railway, along Apple Alley to the Maricourt spur, joining the right of the 22nd Brigade in the German first and support lines.

On the 21st Division front, little ground was gained during the afternoon but a defensive flank was established against Fricourt. The 63rd and 64th brigades had been ordered to exploit the attack on the village at 2:30 p.m., to advance from the Sunken Road and Crucifix Trench, to Fricourt Farm and Shelter Wood, the 63rd Brigade to be ready to intercept a retreat from Fricourt. On the brigade front, attempted movement was met with machine-gun fire from Fricourt Farm and the north side of Fricourt Wood. An attack by the 64th Brigade was carried out in a rush, when the order arrived ten minutes after the bombardment on Shelter Wood had lifted and the attack from Crucifix Trench by parts of two battalions failed. At 4:35 p.m. the divisional commander, Major-General David Campbell, ordered both brigades to consolidate the line from Willow Stream in the British front line, to opposite German Tambour, the German front trench on the left of the 50th Brigade; the 63rd Brigade to consolidate along Lonely Lane, Lozenge Alley and Lozenge Wood, facing Fricourt.

To the north the 64th Brigade held a line from Lozenge Wood, the first intermediate line, Crucifix Trench to Round Wood where touch had been gained with the 34th Division. At 5:33 p.m. Campbell ordered the last two battalions of the 62nd Brigade forward, to relieve the 64th Brigade at dawn on 2 July. At 8:50 p.m. the 17th Division was ordered to take over from the 21st Division facing Fricourt, the 50th Brigade being relieved by the 51st Brigade ready for another attack in the morning, as observers and patrols had reported retirements by the Germans in the area of Fricourt. An opportunity to attack when the German defence was still disorganised was lost, when the arrival of the 51st Brigade was held up by congestion behind the British front line until 5:00 a.m. Very little German firing took place on the 21st Division front overnight, many wounded were recovered and supplies were brought up without interference, although there was an acute water shortage in the captured area.

==== Capture of Fricourt ====
At 10:00 p.m. Rawlinson ordered the offensive to continue in the XV Corps area to take Fricourt, advance to the final objective and to link with III Corps south of Contalmaison. The front around Fricourt remained quiet during the night and a German counter-attack further south at Maricourt was repulsed. Horne ordered an attack on Fricourt at 12:15 p.m. on 2 July, after a 75-minute bombardment, the 17th Division to link with the 7th Division north of Mametz. Soon afterwards a 7th Division patrol reported that Fricourt had been entered unopposed at midnight. A patrol from the 51st Brigade took 100 prisoners from Reserve Infantry Regiment 111 and Major-General Thomas Pilcher ordered the brigade to enter the village immediately. In the confusion, the village was not occupied until noon on 2 July, where eleven German stragglers were captured. The attack continued behind a creeping barrage with Bottom Wood as the final objective. The advance moved through Fricourt Wood where fallen trees, thick undergrowth and German machine-gun fire slowed progress. By nightfall, touch had been gained with the 7th Division on the right and along the north and north-eastern fringes of Fricourt Wood and Fricourt Farm, at the junction with the 21st Division. RFC contact patrol observers followed the attack and reported the fall of the farm minutes afterwards. Railway Alley was relatively undamaged but bombers attacked from the west and took 200 yd (180 m) just before midnight.

=== German 2nd Army ===
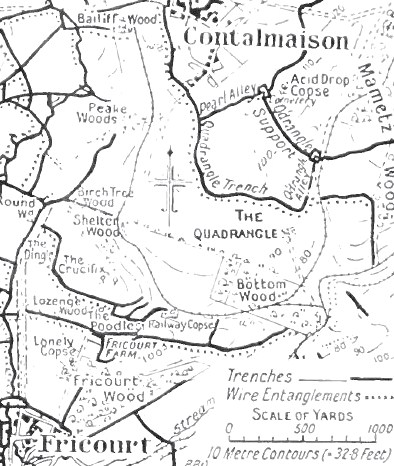
Map of the Fricourt–Contalmaison area,1916

The preliminary bombardment was particularly effective on the front of the 28th Reserve Division and was more destructive on 1 July, when the artillery batteries in the valleys near Montauban and Mametz were destroyed along with their ammunition, few of the guns being withdrawn to the second position. All the field guns of the 28th Reserve Division were put out of action and reports described the bombardment as verheerend (devastating). Much of the garrison was in the front line where most of the dugouts had been built. Telephone communication was cut and machine-guns in Danzig Alley north of Mametz, were destroyed or made inoperable. Scattered resistance in Mametz continued at 6:00 p.m. and the last survivors retired at 7:00 p.m. As soon as the attack began Landwehr Ersatz Battalion 55, two battalions of Infantry Regiment 23 and every available man from Reserve Infantry Regiment 109, were sent to the second position. Reinforcements were not sent forward to the front line, due to uncertainty about the fighting at Montauban.

Opposite the 21st Division, Reserve Infantry Regiment 111 had many casualties in the bombardment and most trenches, obstacles, shallow dugouts and observation posts were destroyed, although a few dugout entrances were kept clear. On Fricourt spur the situation was worse and the northernmost company of Reserve Infantry Regiment 110 was reduced to 80 men. (Note: Morale was said to be poor in Reserve Infantry Regiment 110, which contained a substantial number of soldiers from Alsace.) Mine explosions west of Fricourt at the Kniewerk (Tambour) caused much destruction and the 8th Company of Reserve Infantry Regiment 110 left a machine-gun crew behind, withdrew and was replaced by the 2nd Company, which was outflanked, attacked from behind and all the personnel killed or captured. A replacement company failed to reach the area but took cover in Round Wood, where it repulsed the first 64th Brigade attack. By evening the survivors withdrew towards the Nestlerhöhle (Shoelace Maker's Cave) an elaborate dug-out near Fricourt Wood.

Machine-guns in the second position failed to work and local counter-attacks were not able to retrieve the situation, as the British advance around Mametz outflanked the garrison in Fricourt, where the defence was hampered by fog, gas and smoke. A British attack west of the Tambour was countered by a defensive mine, which inflicted many casualties on the 21st Division as it attacked, along with machine-gun fire from the hill above Fricourt. (Note: James Edmonds, the British official historian, wrote that there was no British account of a mine or an explosion killing 80 British soldiers.) In the area of Reserve Infantry Regiment 109, the attack began with the sound of the mine explosions on the right flank; the effect of the British bombardment had already been sufficient to require the relief of two companies, due on the evening of 1 July, from Infantry Regiment 23. The damage caused by the bombardment, the narrowness of no man's land and the surprise of the Russian sap, allowed the British to break in, while most of the garrison was under cover. An instant counter-attack (Gegenstoß) failed and the defence was pushed back within minutes, one company being back in the third trench by 9:00 a.m.

On the left flank, the III Battalion was also pushed back, despite attempts by the II Battalion to reinforce the defence. The defeat of the 12th Division around Montauban uncovered the southern flank and during the afternoon, constant attacks gradually wore down the defence. At 3:00 p.m. the headquarters of the III Battalion was captured and by 8:00 p.m. the 32 survivors of the battalion rallied in the second position at Bazentin le Petit. During the night, orders from Below arrived for the garrison of Fricourt to withdraw, which was accomplished relatively easily, as the British attack had stopped. Reinforcements from III Battalion, Reserve Infantry Regiment 186 were sent to the area of Reserve Infantry Regiment 111 in the evening of 2 July and were all killed or captured along with the remnants of Reserve Infantry Regiment 111 as the British advanced from Fricourt and Mametz, towards Mametz Wood.

== Aftermath ==
=== Analysis ===
The XV Corps attack took a considerable amount of ground on the flanks, the right advancing 2,500 yd (2,300 m) and the left 2,000 yd (1,800 m); in the centre the attack failed and although enveloped on three sides Fricourt was not captured. In Prior and Wilson's account, the salient around Fricourt made the village inherently vulnerable to artillery-fire in enfilade. The failure to engage in counter-battery fire by XV Corps was redeemed by the emphasis on it by XIII Corps artillery to the south and the French guns of XX Corps, which wiped out the German artillery near Fricourt. The density of the destructive bombardment was much greater than elsewhere and a lack of deep dugouts, led to most of the defenders congregating in those under the front trench, which reduced the capacity of the surviving German infantry to withstand the attack. Prior and Wilson described the failure of the tactical ploy of infantry moving into no man's land before zero hour and the catastrophe of the 50th Brigade attack in the afternoon, after XV Corps had received inaccurate reports from XIII and III Corps. (Note: Prior and Wilson make no comment on the possibility that the XV Corps artillery plan was arranged in the knowledge of the arrangements made by XIII and XX Corps, under the supervision of Major-General Noel Birch and his successor Major-General Charles Budworth, the Fourth Army Major-General Royal Artillery (MGRA). Prior and Wilson also omit mention of some of the battalions of the 7th Division beginning their advance 250 yd (230 m) behind the British front line, that the bombardment of Fricourt failed because of faulty ammunition and that the creeping bombardment began on the German front trench, rather than in no man's land, which had been criticised by Edmonds for moving too quickly.)

C. T. Atkinson, the 7th Division historian, wrote that the success of the 30th, 18th and 7th divisions partly made up for the failures further north and that with the ground gained by the 21st Division, the plan to envelop Fricourt and link the inner flanks of the divisions was completed on 2 July. The infantry advance took four minutes to reach the empty British front line, which had been bombarded by German artillery during the intense fire in the hour before zero and 600 prisoners were taken in Mametz. The afternoon attack of the 20th Brigade achieved an advance sufficient to guard the left flank of the division and during the day, the 7th divisional artillery fired c. 7,000 rounds of field gun ammunition and c. 900 howitzer shells. In the early morning, orders for a resumption of attacks to the final objective were issued, as patrols found Fricourt undefended, took a number of prisoners and met troops of the 17th Division in Willow Trench, taking many prisoners.

=== Casualties ===
Most of the XV Corps casualties were inflicted by machine-gun fire, the 7th Division losing 3,380 men, the 21st Division having 4,256 casualties and the 50th Brigade, 17th Division 1,155 casualties. The 10th Battalion West Yorkshire Regiment had 733 casualties, the greatest number of casualties of any battalion engaged on the first day. 1,625 prisoners were taken and Reserve Infantry Regiment 109 had 2,104 casualties, not all incurred on the XV Corps front.

=== Subsequent operations ===
The advances achieved by the British south of the Albert–Bapaume road continued after 1 July, with the occupation of Fricourt on 2 July and an advance across Caterpillar Valley, where the ground rose 150 ft (46 m) in 1,000 yd (910 m), with more artillery being concentrated on a narrower front and shallower objectives being set. Operations were intended to close on the German second line and threaten the rear of the German defences from Ovillers to Thiepval, ready for another general attack from Longueval to Bazentin le Petit, which required the capture of the intermediate German defences in front of Mametz Wood and Contalmaison. Some of the survivors of the defence of Fricourt and reinforcements which began to arrive on 2 July, took over the intermediate line from Mametz Wood to La Boisselle. Late on 2 July XV Corps ordered an attack by the 17th and 21st divisions to begin at 9:00 a.m. on 3 July, to capture Shelter and Bottom woods south of Contalmaison as the 7th Division attacked towards Mametz Wood.

==== 1918 ====
Fricourt was recaptured by German troops on 26 March 1918, during the retreat of the 17th (Northern) Division and the 1st Dismounted Brigade of the 1st Cavalry Division during Operation Michael, the German spring offensive. The 17th Division minus the 50th Brigade collected round Fricourt. German troops assumed that the British were being routed and attacked the 51st Brigade, which had been reduced to about 600 men, frontally and incurred losses which were considered to be the worst in the March battles. During the afternoon the village was captured and Cubbon's Composite Brigade, assembled from rear area personnel and stragglers, filled the gap between Fricourt Wood and the dismounted cavalry by 4:30 p.m. The 52nd Brigade occupied Fricourt and managed to stop the German advance but on 26 March a general retirement of the V Corps divisions was ordered and the village was evacuated at 4:45 p.m. In the afternoon, air reconnaissance saw that the British defence of the line from Montauban and Ervillers was collapsing and the RFC squadrons in the area, made a maximum effort to disrupt the German advance. The village was recaptured for the last time on 25 August, by the 18th (Eastern) Division, during the Second Battle of Bapaume.
