= Capture of Contalmaison =

- Part of the Battle of the Somme, in the First World War
- Battle of the Somme 1 July – 18 November 1916
| Date | 2–10 July 1916 |
| Location | Picardy, France 50°01′00″N 02°44′00″E |
| Result | British victory |

Belligerents
| British Empire | German Empire |

Commanders and leaders
| (United Kingdom of Great Britain and Ireland) Douglas Haig | (German Empire) Erich von Falkenhayn |

Strength
| 4 divisions (parts) | 17 regiments (parts) |

Casualties and losses
| c. 12,000 | c. 4,000 |
- Contalmaison is a commune in the Somme department of Picardy, northern France.

The Capture of Contalmaison was a tactical incident of the Battle of Albert during the Battle of the Somme in France in 1916. Contalmaison is a commune in the Somme department in Picardy in northern France. The village is 4 mi (6.4 km) north-east of Albert on the D 104, north-west of Mametz Wood and south of Pozières, at the junction of several roads, atop a spur with a good view in all directions. In 1914, there was a church and a château just to the north, a chalk pit nearby and 72 houses, making it the seventh-largest village on the Somme. Military operations in the area began when the German XIV Reserve Corps advanced down the Bapaume–Albert road and Contalmaison was captured on 28 September, by Reserve Infantry Regiment 40 and Reserve Infantry Regiment 110 of the 28th Reserve Division which took 20 prisoners for a loss of three men killed and 21 wounded.

In 1916, the village was between the German first and second positions, each having three trenches about 200 yd (180 m) apart, behind deep fields of barbed wire. The village was ringed by a dense network of trenches and barbed-wire obstacles, with a commanding view of the vicinity. On 1 July, the First day on the Somme a small party from the 34th Division got within 500 yd (460 m) of the village. Rear-area troops were scraped up to counter-attack them and pushed the party back from the Völkerbereitschaft (Readiness Trench) to the Pioneergraben (Pioneer Trench). The 34th Division suffered 6,380 casualties, the highest number for any British division involved in the attack. Operations to capture Contalmaison continued until the village was taken with fresh divisions from 2 to 10 July; the British were able to close up to the German second position, ready for the Battle of Bazentin Ridge (14–17 July).34th Division

The capture of the village cost the British about 12,000 more casualties and Major-General Thomas Pilcher, the commander of the 17th (Northern) Division, was sacked. The attacks forced the Germans into a costly piecemeal defence and many losses were inflicted on the 17 regiments that contributed men for the defence of Contalmaison and the vicinity; Infantry Regiment Lehr was almost annihilated. The German policy of resolute defence and counter-attack exposed many German units to British firepower and by 10 July, German casualties on the Somme had risen to 40,197 men. The village became a backwater until 25 March 1918, when the 79th Reserve Division and the 183rd Division re-captured it during Operation Michael, the German spring offensive. The village was taken by the 113th Brigade of the 38th (Welsh) Division on 25 August, during the Second Battle of Bapaume.

== Background ==
=== 1914 ===
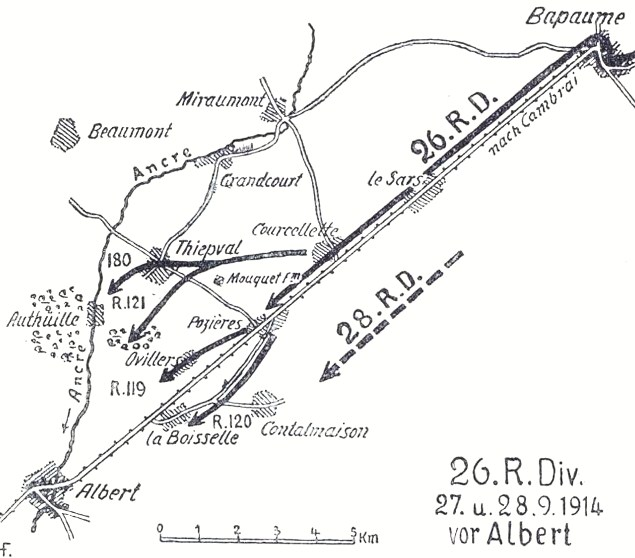
Diagram of the 26th (Württemberg) Reserve Division and the 28th (Baden) Reserve Division attacks towards Albert, late September 1914

Contalmaison village is 4 mi (6.4 km) north-east of Albert on the D 104, north-west of Mametz Wood, to the south of Pozières between Longueval and La Boisselle, at the junction of several roads, atop a spur with a good view in all directions. In 1914, there was a church and a château just to the north, a chalk pit nearby and 72 houses, the seventh-largest village on the Somme. The XIV Reserve Corps (Generalleutnant [Lieutenant-General] Richard von Schubert then Generalleutnant Hermann von Stein from 14 September) began operations west of Bapaume in late September by advancing down the Bapaume–Albert road to the Ancre river, preparatory to an advance down the Somme valley to Amiens. On 28 September, Reserve Infantry Regiment 40 (RIR 40) and RIR 110 of the 28th Reserve Division advanced towards Contalmaison, where French infantry were dug in. By 11:00 a.m. the hill to the north was captured in a costly attack and 20 prisoners taken and the village was captured by noon, with three men killed and 21 wounded.

On 29 September, the attack of the XIV Reserve Corps was stopped by the French around Fricourt and La Boisselle, south of Ovillers. In early November, French artillery reinforcements arrived and bombardments beyond the front line began. On 19 November, two divisions of XI Corps attacked to fix German troops but were repulsed and on 28 November, an attack by the XIV Corps managed to advance the French line by 330–440 yd (300–400 m). In early December, IV Corps attacked and gained 330–1,090 yd (300–1,000 m). The French attacks had been costly and gained little ground; after the end of the Battle of Albert the area round Contalmaison became a backwater except for occasional artillery bombardments into 1916.

=== 1915 ===
In January 1915, General Erich von Falkenhayn, head of Oberste Heeresleitung (OHL, German General Staff) ordered the construction of a systematic defensive system on the Western Front, capable of withstanding attacks indefinitely, with a relatively small garrison. Barbed wire obstacles were enlarged from one belt 5–10 yd (4.6–9.1 m) wide to two belts 30 yd (27 m) wide and about 15 yd (14 m) apart. Double and triple thickness wire was used and laid 3–5 ft (0.91–1.52 m) high. The front line was increased from one trench to three, dug 150–200 yd (140–180 m) apart, the first trench (Kampfgraben) to be occupied by sentry groups, the second (Wohngraben) for the front-trench garrison and the third trench for local reserves. The trenches were traversed and had sentry-posts in concrete recesses built into the parapet. Dugouts had been deepened from 6–9 ft (1.8–2.7 m) to 20–30 ft (6.1–9.1 m), 50 yd (46 m) apart and made large enough for 25 men. An intermediate line of strong points (Stützpunktlinie) about 1,000 yd (910 m) behind the front line was also built. Communication trenches ran back to the reserve line, renamed the second line, which was as well built and wired as the first line. The second line was beyond the range of Allied field artillery, to force an attacker to stop and move artillery forward before assaulting the line.

In mid-July 1915, extensive troop and artillery movements north of the Ancre were seen by German observers. The type of shell fired by the new artillery changed from high explosive to shrapnel and unexploded shells were found to be of a different design. The new infantry opposite, did not continue the live-and-let-live practices of their forerunners and a larger number of machine-guns began firing against the German lines, which did not pause every 25 shots, like French Hotchkiss machine guns. German troops were reluctant to believe that the British had assembled an army large enough to extend as far south as the Somme and a soldier seen near Thiepval, was thought to be a French soldier in a grey hat. By 4 August, it was officially reported by OHL that the 52nd Division and the 26th Reserve Division had seen a man in a brown suit; on 9 August, the situation became clear when a British soldier, working in no man's land, got lost in a mist and was captured.

=== 1916 ===
Bassin de la Somme

After the Second Battle of Champagne (Autumn Battle 25 September – 6 November 1915), a third defence line another 3,000 yd (1.7 mi; 2.7 km) back from the Stützpunktlinie was begun in February and was nearly complete on the Somme front when the battle began. German artillery was organised in a series of sperrfeuerstreifen (barrage sectors); each officer was expected to know the batteries covering his section of the front line and the batteries to be ready to engage fleeting targets. A telephone system was built with lines buried 6 ft (1.8 m) deep for 5 mi (8.0 km) behind the front line, to connect the front line to the artillery. The concentration of troops in the front line on a forward slope guaranteed that it would face the bulk of an artillery bombardment, directed by ground observers on clearly marked lines. Digging and wiring of a new third line began in May, civilians were moved away and stocks of ammunition and hand-grenades were increased in the front-line. On 6 June, Below reported that air reconnaissance indicated an offensive at Fricourt and Gommecourt.

== First day on the Somme ==
=== III Corps plan ===
In the III Corps area, heavy artillery was to fire on the German defences in eight lifts and "jump" from one defence line to the next and the infantry advance was to be preceded by barrages which moved back slowly on a timetable. The sixth lift was to fall on a line behind Contalmaison and Pozières, 85 minutes after zero hour and the eighth lift was to fall 1,000 yd (910 m) beyond after 22 minutes, a procession into the German defences of 2 mi (3.2 km) in 107 minutes. The field artillery barrage was to move very slowly, raking back to the next German trench line in lifts of 50–100–150 yd (46–91–137 m) but faster than the infantry advance, so was not a true creeping barrage. On 28 June, the Fourth Army headquarters ordered that if the initial attacks caused the German defence to collapse, the closest infantry would exploit without waiting for cavalry of the Reserve Army (Lieutenant-General Hubert Gough), which would be 5 mi (8.0 km) west of Albert, ready to advance once the roads had been cleared.

On the right flank of III Corps, the 34th Division, was to capture the German positions from the Fricourt Spur and Sausage Valley to the far side of La Boisselle, then advance to a line about 800 yd (730 m) short of the German second line from Contalmaison to Pozières. The division would have to capture a fortified village and six German trench lines, in a 2 mi (3.2 km) advance on a 2,000 yd (1,800 m) front. The 19th (Western) Division (19th (Western) Division) in corps reserve was to move forward to the vacant trenches in the Tara–Usna line, ready to relieve the attacking divisions, after the objectives had been reached. If the German defences collapsed the 19th (Western) Division and 49th (West Riding) Division in reserve, were to advance either side of the Albert–Bapaume road under the command of the Reserve Army.

Two columns on the right flank were to be formed by the 101st Brigade (Brigadier-General Robert Gore) with one battalion leading and a supporting battalion behind, followed by a battalion detached from the 103rd (Tyneside Irish) Brigade (Brigadier-General N. J. G. Cameron). The two columns on the left flank were from the 102nd (Tyneside Scottish) Brigade (Brigadier-General Trevor Tiernan) and the remaining two battalions of the 103rd Brigade were to follow the columns. The first objective of the two leading lines of battalions was the German front system of four trench lines, the fourth trench being about 2,000 yd (1,800 m) from the British front line and to be reached at 8:18 a.m., 48 minutes after zero hour. The second objective was the German second intermediate line (Kaisergraben) just short of Contalmaison and Pozières, to be reached at 8:58 a.m., where the 101st and 102nd brigades were to dig in. The 103rd Brigade was then to pass through and reach the final objective on the far side of Contalmaison and Pozières at 10:10 a.m. and consolidate, ready to attack the German second position 800 yd (730 m) further on.

=== 1 July ===
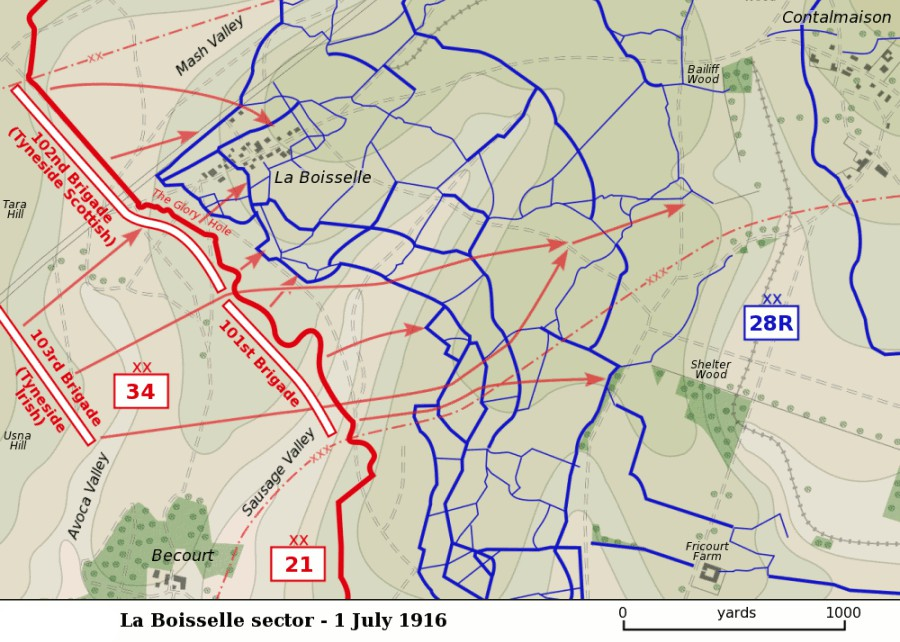
Sausage Valley, Somme 1 July 1916

At 7:30 a.m. on 1 July, the infantry of the 34th Division rose from their jumping-off trenches. Within ten minutes, 80 per cent of the men in the leading battalions had become casualties from German machine-gun fire, which began as soon as the British bombardment lifted off the German front line. Many of the German machine-guns were in concealed positions behind the front line had not been hit by the bombardment. As soon as the advance of the head of an attacking column was stopped, the rest of the column bunched up and made an easy target. The right-hand column had to advance along the convex slope on the west side of Fricourt Spur, for which the leading companies of the 15th (Service) Battalion (1st Edinburgh), The Royal Scots (Lothian Regiment) (15th Royal Scots) had advanced to within 200 yd (180 m) of the German front line before zero hour.

When the barrage lifted, the troops overran the German front trench on the higher part of the slope but German flanking fire from Sausage Valley and La Boisselle forced the leading companies on the right eastwards. Parties of the 15th Royal Scots were left behind to attack at Sausage Redoubt and the rest advanced straight up the slope, straying into the 21st Division sector in the XV Corps area on the right. By 7:48 a.m. both battalions were atop the Fricourt Spur but Sausage and Scots redoubts were still occupied by German troops. The infantry continued for about 1 mi (1.6 km) to Birch Tree Wood, before the error in navigation was realised after thirty minutes. The British advance had overrun the junction of Reserve Infantry Regiment 110 and Reserve Infantry Regiment 111 (RIR 111) and got into Pioneergraben, separating two infantry companies; some parties reached the Völkerberitschaft, 500 yd (460 m) further on. The battalions then turned north, the 15th Royal Scots up Birch Tree Trench in the second intermediate line, towards Peake Woods, with the 16th Royal Scots in support along the Fricourt–Pozières road, 200 yd (180 m) behind.

A company of the reserve battalion of RIR 110 counter-attacked from Peake Woods throwing hand-grenades and German troops in Scots Redoubt and the third and fourth trenches behind the Scots, emerged from cover and engaged them with machine-gun fire. The German attack inflicted many casualties and forced the 15th Royal Scots back to Birch Tree Wood and Shelter Wood, driving back the 16th Royal Scots and parties from the second column to Round Wood. The Scots advanced to Wood Alley and Scots Redoubt, collecting stray parties and captured both positions. Some troops had advanced beyond the first objective and faced the Contalmaison Spur 1,000 yd (910 m) beyond and German accounts mention a party of the 16th Royal Scots, which got into Contalmaison before being annihilated. A battalion which had followed behind the Royal Scots was pinned down in no man's land by massed machine-gun fire but small groups managed to press on to the Fricourt–Pozières road and some parties, accompanied by a few stragglers, got to Acid Drop Copse and the fringe of Contalmaison. As news filtered back, Gore sent the 16th Royal Scots headquarters forward to take command and consolidate, creating a defensive flank for XV Corps.

== Prelude ==
=== Preliminary operations ===
==== British: 2–3 July ====
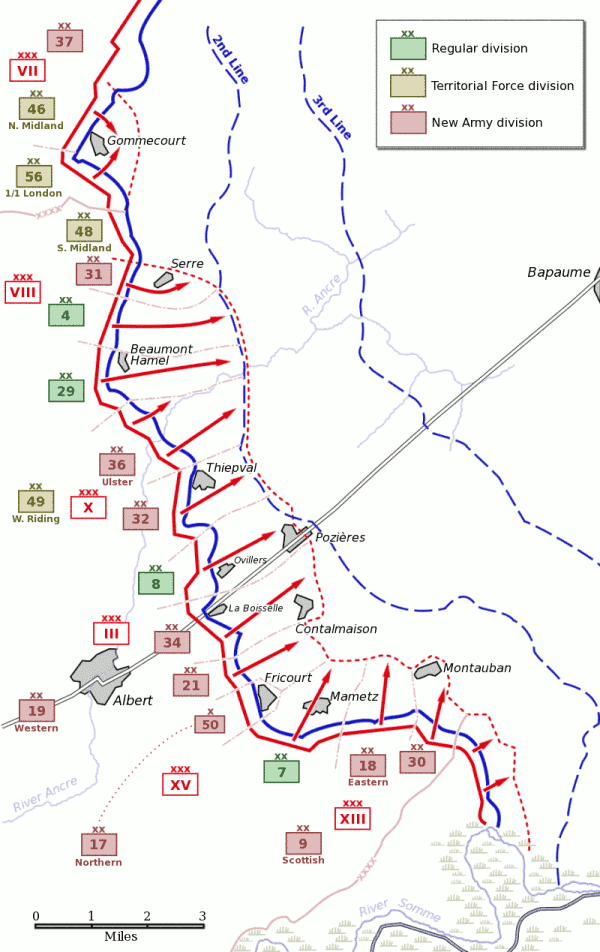
Anglo-French objectives, north bank of the Somme, 1 July 1916

General Douglas Haig, commander of the British Expeditionary Force (BEF), had visited the Lieutenant-General Henry Rawlinson at the Fourth Army headquarters at 10:30 a.m. on 2 July and said that ammunition, particularly its low quality, rather than a lack of replacements, limited British freedom of action. Haig wanted to exploit the success on the right flank by advancing from Mametz Wood and Contalmaison towards the German second position on the Longueval–Bazentin le Petit ridge. The XV Corps headquarters ordered an attack by the 17th (Northern) Division and the 21st Division after a thirty-minute bombardment, to capture Bottom Wood and Shelter Wood to cut out a German salient north of Mametz and Fricourt. At 9:00 a.m. on 3 July, a battalion of the 51st Brigade, 17th (Northern) Division attacked and was engaged with machine-gun fire, taking until 11:30 a.m. to reach Railway Alley, after reinforcement by another battalion and bombers from two more. A company of the 7th Border got into the west end of Bottom Wood and was isolated until the 21st Division captured Shelter Wood on the left and the German defence collapsed. The 7th Border pressed on and met parties from the 7th Division in the rest of Bottom Wood, the operation costing the 51st Brigade about 500 casualties.

A battalion of the 62nd Brigade (Brigadier-General Rawling), 21st Division, reached Shelter Wood and Birch Tree Wood to the north-west, assisted by the brigade machine-gun company, having suffered losses from German machine-guns. Many German troops emerged from dug outs to defend the woods and another battalion was sent forward to help. Birch Tree Wood fell but then a German counter-attack by bombers from the right nearly succeeded and slowed the attack on Shelter Wood. Just after 11:30 a.m., British aircraft reported that German troops were advancing from Contalmaison and Rawling planned a pincer attack with a battalion from reserve, covered by Stokes mortar fire. The capture of Shelter Wood was completed and at 2:00 p.m. the German counter-attack on Shelter and Bottom woods was repulsed, mainly by the fire of Lewis guns; the 63rd Brigade formed a defensive flank on the left at Round Wood. About 600 men of Infantry Regiment 186 were captured, along with about 200 more from Infantry Regiment 23 and RIR 109, 110 and 111. The German battalions were almost destroyed, losing over 3,000 casualties, against a British loss of fewer than 1,000 men.

The XV Corps divisions began to consolidate south of Contalmaison and repair the roads and light railway. Reports indicated that the German defence had not recovered and the 7th Division was ordered to advance into Mametz Wood on the right of Contalmaison after dark. The 17th (Northern) Division reported that Wood Trench and Quadrangle Trench to the left of the wood were weakly garrisoned and that Peake Woods, halfway to Contalmaison were empty. The 21st Division was relieved during the night by the 52nd Brigade, 17th (Northern) Division. By the end of the day, many British officers in the area thought that the Germans were beaten and that an early advance could succeed but Rawlinson was reluctant to act without co-operation from the French. At a meeting on 3 July, the French objected to the effort being made from Longueval to Contalmaison, demanding that operations re-commence north of the Albert–Bapaume road. To prepare an attack on the German second position, the III Corps was ordered to capture Contalmaison and reach a line from Mametz Wood to the far side of Contalmaison, Bailiff Wood and west towards La Boisselle.

==== British: 4–6 July ====
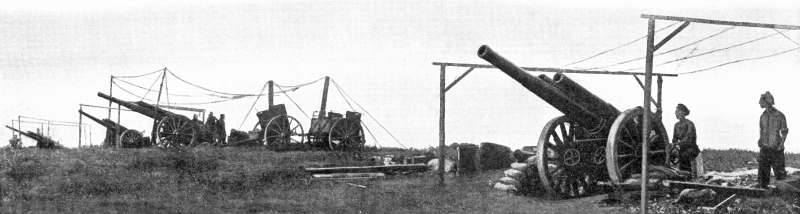
Battery of British 60-pounder guns, Contalmaison

On the night of 3/4 July, it began to rain and on 4 July there was a thunderstorm in the afternoon, which flooded trenches and turned the ground to mud. Much of the RFC was grounded but 52 aircraft managed to fly at low altitude on artillery-observation sorties. From 4 to 6 July, the French and British made preparations for an attack due on 7 July, from Hardecourt, Trones Wood, Mametz Wood and Contalmaison. Allied destructive and harassing bombardments continued as guns were moved forward. Engineers and tunnellers continued to rebuild roads but engineering stores ran short and the difficulty of providing water for the thousands of troops in the area led to two cavalry divisions being sent back to Abbeville. The Germans managed to conduct substantial bombardments at places and counter-attacked north of the Albert–Bapaume road. On 4 July, the 17th (Northern) Division managed a short advance towards Contalmaison and a night attack was planned for 4/5 July from Mametz Wood and to the left up to Shelter Alley but rainstorms slowed preparations. The attack eventually began at 12:45 a.m. on 5 July, when two battalions of the 52nd Brigade crept forward to 100 yd (91 m) short of the German lines, obscured by the dark and the rain.

The British infantry rushed the German defences at zero hour and captured Quadrangle Trench and Shelter Alley, taking prisoners from IR 163 and IR 190. On the left flank, the 23rd Division began supporting attacks and at 6:45 a.m. attacked at Horseshoe Trench but took until 10:00 a.m. on 5 July to take the ground, only to lose it to a counter-attack. The Germans attacked again in the afternoon and the rest of the 69th Brigade (Brigadier-General Lambert) was committed. Just after 6:00 p.m. three battalions attacked in the open and captured Horseshoe Trench and the west end of Lincoln Redoubt and took about 200 prisoners but touch with the 17th (Northern) Division in Shelter Alley to the east was not obtained. Next day, the German artillery bombardment increased and during the night the 68th Brigade (Brigadier-General H. P. Croft) relieved the 69th Brigade and a battalion occupied Triangle Trench. BEF headquarters issued a memorandum, that the British advantage in numbers and the demoralisation of the German infantry required any success to be exploited. Military intelligence reported that only 15 German battalions were in line from Hardecourt to the Albert–Bapaume road, eleven of which had been severely depleted, although 33 battalions had operated and another 40 were in reserve. The Fourth Army had six divisions in the front line and five more in reserve, outnumbering the Germans by 2:1. During the afternoon 3 Squadron reconnoitred Mametz Wood and those south of Contalmaison and reported that Acid Drop Copse and sections of trench had been demolished.

=== German: 2–6 July ===
The British attack north of the Bapaume–Albert road failed on 1 July but in the area of the 28th Reserve Division south of the road, the British captured Montauban Ridge and the 28th Reserve Division only avoided destruction because of the arrival of the 10th Bavarian Division, the corps reserve. The British attacks south of the road continued and Fricourt was occupied on the night of 2/3 July. Next day, the British advanced up the rise facing the south-west side of Contalmaison and established positions south of Mametz Wood to the right. The 3rd Guard Division was rushed from Valenciennes and relieved the remnants of the 28th Reserve and 10th Bavarian divisions from the Bapaume–Albert road, past Mametz Wood to Flat Iron Copse. After the loss of the first position south of the road on 1 July, the defenders fought on, from intermediate positions in front of the second position along the south side of the Pozières–Ginchy Ridge. The defence took place along the spurs running down from the ridge to the Mametz–Montauban valley.

The main 3rd Guard Division position blocking the approaches to Contalmaison was the Kaisergraben running across Contalmaison Spur. The trench had been dug before the battle and had barbed wire obstacles in front and several deep-mined dugouts, some 20 ft (6.1 m) deep. On the German right was Quergraben III (Fourth Street to the British) which connected the Kaisergraben with Ovillers and on the left, Wood Trench linked with Mametz Wood. On the night of 6/7 July, the relief of the Guard by the 183rd Division from Cambrai began but IR 184 was detached, leaving two regiments to take over, who found that the second position had been severely damaged and that many dug-out entrances were blocked. The area was still occupied by support units of the 3rd Guard Division and many of the 183rd Division troops had to lie on the open, losing many casualties to British artillery-fire. The bombardment continued during the morning and III Battalion, RIR 122 had 225 casualties as Contalmaison disappeared in a cloud of smoke, debris flying upwards as heavy shells exploded.

== Battle ==
=== 7 July ===
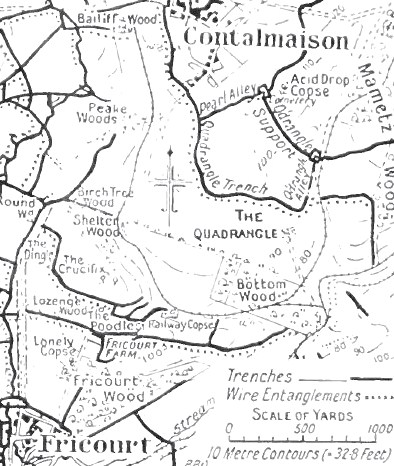
Diagram of German defences, vicinity of Fricourt and Contalmaison, July 1916

XV Corps headquarters decided that the attack on Mametz Wood and Contalmaison should begin with the capture of Quadrangle Support Trench 500 yd (460 m) beyond Quadrangle Trench and Pearl Alley. The ground was open and the artillery had difficulty in ranging so an attack at 2:00 a.m. by the 17th (Northern) Division was ordered by Horne, against objections from Pilcher and the brigadiers that the trenches would become untenable under machine-gun fire from Contalmaison and Mametz Wood. A 35-minute bombardment was fired on the German front line and Contalmaison, increased in intensity for the last ten minutes, during which two 52nd Brigade battalions and one from the 51st Brigade began their advance. The Germans were alert and opened fire under the light of flares behind a defensive barrage. The leading waves were also hit by British shells falling short, found that the German wire was uncut and fell back to the start-line. The 183rd Division took over the front line on the night of 7/8 July, Infantry Regiment 183 from Grenadier Regiment 9, Ovillers to Contalmaison and RIR 122 from IR 163, Contalmasion eastwards to the south-west of Mametz Wood; Infantry Regiment Lehr along the south edge of the wood and Flat Iron Copse, was left behind. Part of the left-hand battalion got into Pearl Alley and some found themselves in Contalmaison, before being driven back from the village and Pearl Alley by IR Lehr and the bombers of GR 9.

The Germans tried to extend their counter-attacks from the east of Contalmaison, towards the advanced positions of the 17th (Northern) Division, which were eventually repulsed at about 7:00 a.m. If the night attack failed, the preliminary bombardment from 7:20 to 8:00 a.m. was to continue for another thirty minutes. The III Corps was informed in time for the 8:00 a.m. attack and that the 17th (Northern) Division would try again at the same time. The barrage began promptly and a German counter-bombardment started on the line of the night attack. Communication forward from the 17th (Northern) Division headquarters was so slow that the troops of the 52nd Brigade were late and the barrage had lifted. When the attack began the troops were caught by machine-gun fire from Mametz Wood; the survivors were ordered back apart from a few advanced posts. On the right, a battalion of the 50th Brigade had tried to bomb up Quadrangle Alley but was driven back and a company which tried to move up the west side of Mametz Wood were caught by machine-gun fire from Strip Trench and lost half their number. (Note: It rained during the day with gusty winds, keeping much of the RFC grounded. Trenches filled with mud so deep in places, that soldiers collapsed from exhaustion and ammunition wagons needed teams of up to 14 horses. Requests for artillery support went unanswered when German bombardments cut telephone lines left on the surface.)

In the III Corps area on the left flank, the 68th Brigade, 23rd Division was to advance as the 24th Brigade drew level on the right but was delayed by the barrage on Bailiff Wood until 9:15 a.m., when a battalion reached the southern fringe before machine-gun fire from Contalmaison forced them back 400 yd (370 m). The attack on Contalmaison by the 24th Brigade, was to have begun when the 52nd Brigade attacked Pearl Alley again on the right at 8:00 a.m. Mud and communication delays led to the attack not starting until after 10:00 a.m., when two battalions attacked from the south end of Pearl Alley and Shelter Wood on the left. The troops advanced in the open against machine-gun fire and got into Contalmaison up to the church, in which prisoners were taken and counter-attacks by a company of RIR 122 and then a company of GR 9 were repulsed. British artillery-fire on two companies of reinforcements caused them to panic and run away. The attack from Shelter Wood failed because the troops were on lower ground and were slowed by mud and a rainstorm, as machine-gun fire from Contalmaison and Bailiff Wood stopped the attack. The battalion in the village withdrew later in the afternoon after running out of ammunition and hand grenades. An attempt to attack again at 8:00 p.m. was cancelled due to the mud, a heavy German barrage and lack of fresh troops; the 68th Brigade dug in on the west in touch with the 24th Brigade, which faced Contalmaison from the south.

XV Corps had ordered the renewal of the attack by the 17th (Northern) and 23rd divisions at 5:00 p.m. but mud delayed the 50th Brigade and its attack was put back to 6:20 p.m., then 8:00 p.m., when two battalions attacked with one from the 52nd Brigade on the left. A 3 Squadron aircraft flew a reconnaissance and dropped a message at 5:30 p.m. that Quadrangle Trench was still full of German troops. All three battalions were caught in the mud and shot down by an artillery barrage and machine-gun fire from ahead and both flanks, losing about 400 casualties by the time the attack was abandoned. The 23rd Division attacked again to close a 400 yd (370 m) gap between the 24th and 68th brigades but the troops got into deep mud and were trapped. Later in the day, the 24th Brigade tried to attack Contalmaison but was stopped by machine-gun and artillery fire. On the left, the 19th (Western) Division bombers skirmished all day and at 6:00 p.m., a warning from an observer in a reconnaissance aircraft, led to an advance by German troops towards Bailiff Wood, being ambushed and stopped by small-arms fire.

=== 8 July ===
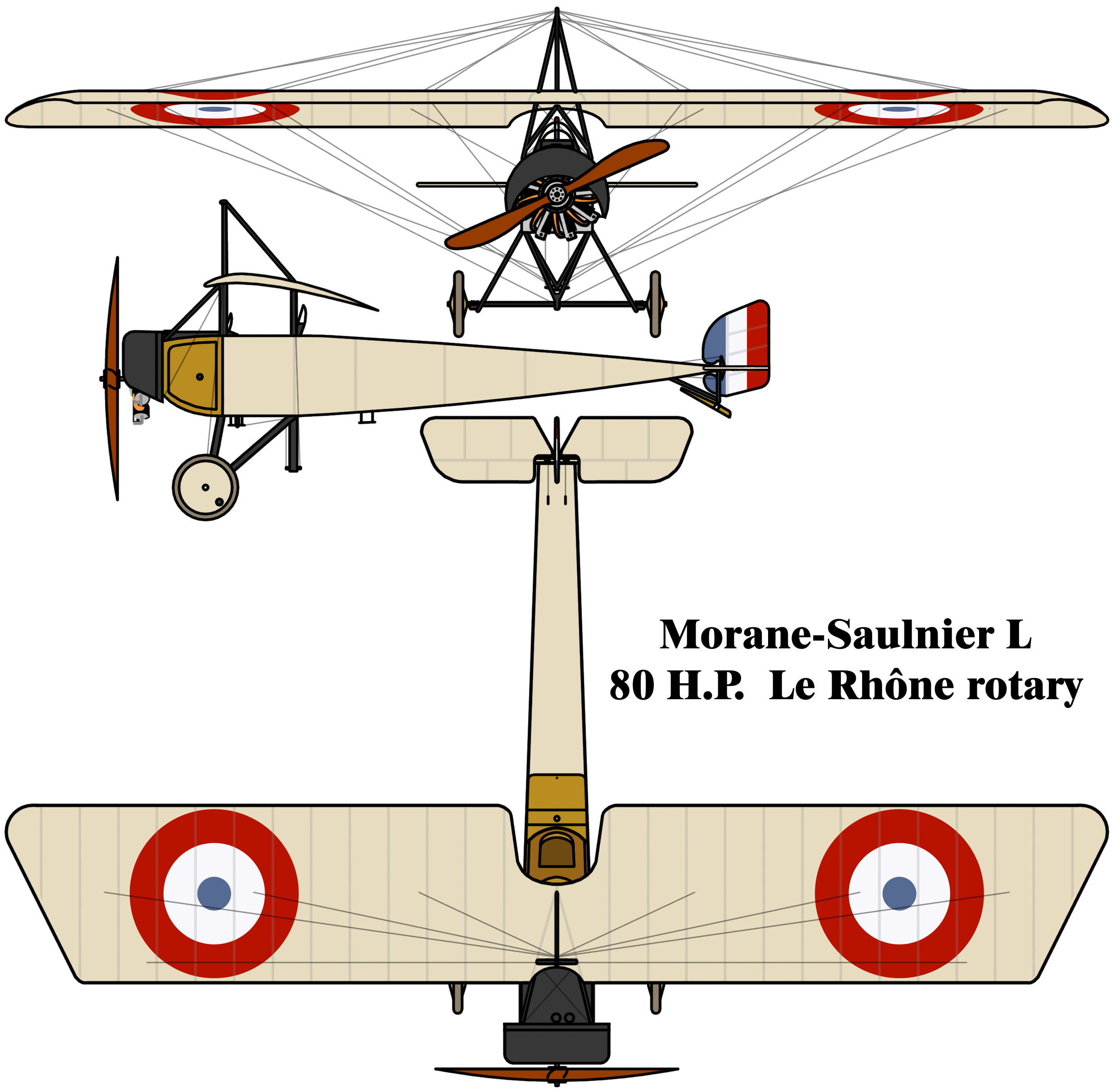
Morane-Saulnier L (Parasol), the type flown by 3 Squadron RFC

The 23rd Division was ordered to bomb forward towards Contalmaison and close a 400 yd (370 m) gap between the 24th and 68th brigades but trenches were so full of mud that many men were stranded and had to be pulled out. Patrols towards Contalmaison and Bailiff Wood found them still occupied, despite reports that they had been abandoned and the 24th Brigade attacked the village in the evening with the companies which had suffered the fewest casualties the day before. The attack was repulsed by machine-gun fire and artillery-fire; a battalion trying to advance from Peake Woods, midway between Shelter Wood and the village, to join with the 68th Brigade, was also defeated. Another 3 Squadron aircraft was aloft to watch the attacks and reported that when the British barrage began rockets were fired from the German trenches, which brought forth from German artillery batteries a wall of fire from Bottom Wood to Bailiff Wood, west of Contalmaison. The crew flew behind the German barrage and saw no German troops in Quadrangle Trench until 6:15 p.m. when men in field grey suddenly appeared 6–12 men to a traverse and repulsed the attack. IR 183 was ordered to attack Quergraben III at midnight but the rain delayed preparations and the attack eventually began at 3:00 a.m. after dawn had broken. Observers of the 34th Division saw the Germans and directed artillery and machine-gun fire on the attackers, preventing them from advancing.

=== 9 July ===
On 9 July, the 24th and 68th Brigades of the 23rd Division spent the morning trying to improve their positions south and west of Contalmaison, ready for a bigger attack by the 69th Brigade on 10 July. Indications of a German counter-attack from the village were followed by bombardment of the 68th Brigade front, which caused many casualties since the trenches were shallow and crowded with men. A German attack was rapidly dispersed by small arms and artillery fire. A battalion of the 24th Brigade established a machine-gun nest in a commanding position south of the village and patrols of a 68th Brigade battalion entered Bailiff Wood, before being shelled out by British artillery. An attempt to return at 6:15 p.m. was forestalled by a German counter-attack by parts of II Battalion and III Battalion, IR 183 of the 183rd Division at 4:30 p.m. to reinforce the line between Contalmaison and Pozières but was repulsed with many casualties. (Note: The German attack had been ordered for 1:30 p.m. but Colonel Schultze, the commander of IR 183 was wounded and a delay to find a replacement led to the attack beginning at 3:30 p.m., long after the preparatory bombardment had ended; the attackers only reached trenches between the Roerdergraben and Quergraben III.) The preliminary bombardment had been fired but when the delayed attack began at 8:15 p.m. no artillery preparation was possible, because telephone contact with the artillery had been cut off. Two companies fought their way into the wood and the trenches either side. On the right a trench block was built and a German counter-attack repulsed.

The 17th (Northern) Division attacked Quadrangle Support Trench early in the morning and again at midday by bombing up trenches but took very little ground. A surprise attack from Quadrangle Trench, by a battalion of the 50th Brigade and one of the 51st Brigade, plus attached bombers, was attempted at 11:20 p.m. On the right flank, German small-arms fire halted the attack by only 40 men, which was then reinforced by two companies from the 50th Brigade but the survivors were forced back to the start line. On the left, the 51st Brigade captured the west end of Quadrangle Support Trench and pressed on towards Contalmaison, destroying the 11th Company, RIR 122. Germans at the west end built a barricade covered by a machine-gun but troops of the 8th South Staffords and the 7th Lincolns advanced either side of Pearl Alley towards Acid Drop Copse and stopped when they realised that there were no British troops on the flanks. The 10th and 12th companies of III Battalion, IR 183 continued to resist attempts by the 50th Brigade to advance and the parties on the left were ordered to retire before dawn, except for a machine-gun team near the copse which were overlooked, the battalion losing 219 casualties.

By late on 9 July, II and III battalions, IR 183 held the Kabelgraben (Cable Trench) and Roedergraben (Forester Trench) and I Battalion was in reserve at Pozières; the I Battalion, RIR 122 garrisoned Contalmasion and the Kaisergraben to the west, the III Battalion held Quadrangle Support and Wood Support and the II Battalion was in reserve in the second position behind Contalmaison Villa. The 5th Company, II Battalion was sent to reinforce the 9th Company in Wood Support, which had lost 50 per cent of its men in a bombardment. Another company was sent into Mametz Wood, leaving only the 6th and 7th companies left in reserve. II Battalion, IR Lehr remained along the south side of the wood and Flat Iron Copse, with the III Battalion in reserve around Bazentin le Petit.(The defence of this part of the German front had been conducted by 15 battalions on 1 July (BRIR 6, IR 62, RIR 109,110 and 111) and from 2 July, troops from the 12th Reserve Division, elements of the 185th, 12th, 10th Bavarian and 3rd Guard divisions and IR 163 of the 17th Reserve Division had joined the defence; the 183rd Division was en route to the Somme front.)

==== Night reinforcement ====
At dawn, the 6th Company of RIR 122 arrived in Quadrangle Support, after a fraught night march. Leutnant Köstlin had received the order in the afternoon of 9 July and took the company back to Martinpuich for supplies and ammunition but the field kitchen draught horse bolted from a shell with the field kitchen. Ammunition took until after midnight to issue and then the company moved forward, with two machine-guns. Two guides had been sent back from the III Battalion but it was so dark that Köstlin went cross-country on a compass bearing. The column lost cohesion in the dark between Martinpuich and Bazentin because of the number of shell-holes and trenches to traverse and the halts to form up took too much time. Köstlin formed the company into columns of sections after passing over the second position and the advance quickened. The ground was under shellfire and casualties began to increase. Köstlin decided to avoid Mametz Wood and move in the open between the wood and Comtalmaison on the line of the Grossherzogsgraben (Grand Duke Trench, Pearl Alley to the British) to Quadrangle Trench and then to the wood from Quadrangle Support. As they crossed the Contalmaison–Bazentin road at 2:30 a.m. as dawn was breaking, Köstlin sent the guides forward who took twenty minutes to get back and report that the trench was straight ahead. As the company advanced, a machine-gun opened fire from the right and caused much confusion. Köstlin shouted "Double march, into the trench in front" but it was another 300 yd (270 m) further on and only thirty men followed him, the rest retreating in confusion to the second position or taking cover.

=== 10 July ===
Lambert and the battalion commanders of the 69th Brigade reconnoitred the ground and arranged support from the artillery of the 23rd and 34th divisions. Two battalions assembled along Horseshoe Trench, in a line 1,000 yd (910 m) long, facing Contalmaison 2,000 yd (1,800 m) away to the east. Two companies were sent 500 yd (460 m) forward to Bailiff Wood, to make a flank attack on the north-west end of the village. After a thirty-minute bombardment from 4:00 p.m., the artillery firing from the south increased the rate of fire as the infantry closed on the village; a creeping barrage moved in five short lifts, from the trench around the west side of the village to the eastern fringe. A smoke screen failed as insufficient ammunition could be carried forward in time but the attack was supported by every machine-gun in the division, firing on the edges of the village and its approaches. The infantry moved forward in four waves, with mopping-up parties following, through return fire from the garrison, uncut wire on the right causing a delay and then reached a trench at the edge of the village, forcing the survivors to retreat into Contalmaison. The waves broke up into groups and advanced faster than the barrage but the divisional artillery commander was able to speed up the creeping barrage. The village was overrun despite determined opposition from parts of the garrison, one British battalion losing 155 men and taking 188 prisoners from RIR 122.

The Germans in the village were from I Battalion, RIR 122 but casualties had reduced the battalion to fewer than 600 men. Small detachments got into the village to reinforce but casualties from British artillery were constant and the village was reduced to rubble. The final bombardment beginning at 3:20 a.m. broke the resilience of the garrison and about 200 troops ran back to Bazentin and Pozières. Other troops took refuge in the remaining dugouts in the Kaisergraben (Emperor Trench west of the village, Quadrangle Trench to the British) and in village cellars. The alarm was raised at 4:50 p.m. but only 16 men emerged from cover in the 3rd and 4th Company area at the west side of the village. Little could be seen through the smoke and dust but German artillery was able to engage the British advancing from the west. The battalion that was delayed at the garden hedge was engaged by the German party still willing to resist, which inflicted about 104 casualties but failed to stop the advance. The commander of I Battalion, RIR 122 was captured at the château, 168 unwounded and 100 wounded prisoners being taken, 69th Brigade casualties being 855 from 10 to 11 July.

The troops of the 2nd Company in the south-eastern part of the village were trapped and a counter-attack towards the road junction south of the church was defeated. The company retreated along Pearl Alley, a rearguard holding the Cutting until dark fell. The survivors of the 6th, 10th, 11th and 12th companies in Quadrangle Support Trench were enveloped on three sides and reduced to drinking muddy water from the trench bottom but no attack came. After dark a diversion was staged and the garrison retreated to the second position, 125 men making it back despite being fired on as they approached the position. IR 183 counter-attacked Quergraben III (Fourth Street) again at 5:00 p.m. but collided with the 111th and 112th Brigades of the 34th Division, co-operating with the 69th Brigade attack on Contalmaison. The 111th Brigade was forced back to Quergraben III with 358 losses, having taken 100 prisoners and the 112th Brigade gave ground until a battalion made a bayonet counter-attack. The IR 183 report blamed fire on the left flank and rear, from the British who had got into Contalmaison, as the Germans reached the Roerdergraben and at 8:00 p.m. the regiment was ordered to retire to Kabelgraben and Latorffgraben trenches and hold Pozières at all costs.

The flank attack on the north end also reached its objective, met the main attacking force at 5:30 p.m. and sniped at the Germans as they retreated towards the second position; only c. 100 troops of the I Battalion, GR 9 making it back. The village was consolidated with the help of an engineer field company inside a box barrage, maintained all night and a large counter-attack was repulsed by bombers at 9:00 p.m. Two more field companies were delayed by German artillery-fire and then by congestion and took until morning to arrive. The troops of the 23rd Division began to be relieved by the 1st Division (Major-General Peter Strickland).

=== 11 July ===
By dawn, IR 183 had completed a retirement to Kabelgraben and Latorffgraben trenches, having lost about 1,000 men and in the centre, RIR 122 was back in the second position from Pozières to Bazentin le Petit behind a screen of machine-gun posts north of Mametz Wood and extending towards Contalmaison, having lost 1,211 casualties in two days but IR Lehr was still holding Flat Iron Copse. By noon on 11 July, the 23rd Division was relieved by the 1st Division, having lost 3,485 men up to 10 July. The German positions between Mametz Wood and Contalmaison, were captured by the 17th (Northern) Division, after they were outflanked by the capture of the village and the southern part of the wood, although bombing attacks up trenches on 9 July had failed. At 11:20 p.m., a surprise bayonet charge was attempted by a battalion each from the 50th and 51st brigades, which reached part of Quadrangle Support Trench on the left but eventually failed with many casualties. After the capture of Contalmaison next day, an afternoon attack by part of the 51st Brigade advanced from the sunken road east of the village, to Quadrangle Support Trench. Parties of the 50th Brigade attacked westwards up Strip Trench and Wood Support Trench, against German defenders who fought hand-to-hand, at great cost to both sides, before the objective was captured. Touch was gained with the 38th (Welsh) Division in the wood and the 23rd Division in the village, before the 21st Division took over early on 11 July; the 17th (Northern) Division had lost 4,771 casualties since 1 July.

== Aftermath ==
=== Analysis ===
In a 1925 Army Quarterly article, based on German sources, G. C. Wynne wrote that German historians praised the defenders of Contalmaison, IR 183 being described as at the peak of its efficiency. The regiment still contained many pre-war trained officers and NCOs leading young troops who had spent the winter training. Three British divisions had attacked nine battalions from IR 183, RIR 122 and IR Lehr. The British infantry were described as energetic but lacking in tactical skill and unable to exploit success. The German defeat was ascribed to the power of the British artillery, which overwhelmed the outnumbered German guns. The British artillery was accurate, benefiting from air supremacy quickly to engage targets, while the German guns had no help from artillery-observation aircraft. The historian of RIR 122 had written that the determined defence forced the British into resorting to masses of infantry, who suffered mass casualties; the British artillery expended a vast quantity of shells and lost much time in capturing only an intermediate defensive position held by a small force. (Note: Essays drawing on German regimental sources in the Army Quarterly from 1924 to 1939, were republished as Landrecies to Cambrai: Case Studies of German Offensive and Defensive Operations on the Western Front 1914–17 in 2010.)

In 2005, Prior and Wilson wrote that Rawlinson had not sufficiently co-ordinated the Fourth Army corps to ensure attacks at the same times, with adequate artillery support, against realistic objectives. From 5 to 10 July, the 23rd Division attacked Contalmaison eight times and the 17th (Northern) Division on the right attacked eleven times but never simultaneously; artillery co-operation with a neighbouring corps was arranged only once. The British divisions lost about 3,500 casualties each; in III Corps, divisions also failed to co-ordinate, the 19th (Western) and 34th divisions attacking La Boisselle on the left, only once managing to attack at the same time as the 23rd Division. An officer wrote that there had not been enough reconnaissance, attacks were disjointed, liaison between flanking units was neglected, too many small attacks were made by bombing up trenches instead of fewer, better supported, simultaneous attacks over the top and that the artillery was too often out of touch with the front line, no artillery liaison officers being provided and that misleading reports were made by observers in balloons. Contalmaison was attacked from the wrong direction and headquarters were too distant to command.

Despite the difficulties, several elaborately fortified positions had been captured in twelve days, 20 sq mi (52 km^{2}) of ground being captured from 2 to 13 July, compared to the 3 sq mi (7.8 km^{2}) taken on 1 July. The defenders had been reduced to a state of disorganisation and the French and British attacks after 2 July had occurred in the area where the first position had been overrun, with many casualties inflicted the defenders. Much of the German artillery had been destroyed by counter-battery bombardments and the German defence was compromised by the German commanders demanding an unyielding defence and counter-attacks against every loss of territory. Reserves were thrown into the defensive battle piecemeal, rather than being held back for organised counter-attacks or making tactical withdrawals to conserve manpower. The strain imposed by the Entente attacks after 1 July led Below to issue an order of the day (2nd Army Order I a 575 secret) on 3 July, forbidding voluntary withdrawals,

The outcome of the war depends on 2nd Army being victorious on the Somme. Despite the current enemy superiority in artillery and infantry we have got to win this battle.... For the time being, we must hold our current positions without fail and improve on them by means of minor counter-attacks. I forbid the voluntary relinquishment of positions.... The enemy must be made to pick his way forward over corpses.

— General von Below, 3 July 1916

after Falkenhayn had sacked the 2nd Army Chief of Staff, Generalmajor Paul Grünert and General Günther von Pannewitz (XVII Corps), after Pannewitz had been allowed to withdraw to the third position south of the Somme; Grünert was replaced by Colonel Fritz von Loßberg. The Germans were equally capable of matching British ineptitude. In 2006, Jack Sheldon wrote that the limited attacks after 1 July were inescapable, given the commitments made to the French but this led to the British attacking on ground that was easier for the Germans to defend.

In 2009, William Philpott wrote that many attacks had been made against skilful opponents in well-fortified positions, the attacks often being tactically crude, poorly co-ordinated and with inadequate artillery support. The inexperience of the New Army divisions was manifest but despite the tenacity of the German defenders, the positions were captured, often thanks to the capacity of battalion and brigade commanders to intervene at crucial moments. The 38th (Welsh), 17th (Northern) and 23rd divisions had been expended to capture Mametz Wood and Contalmaison, for more than 12,000 casualties and the sacking of the commanders of the 38th (Welsh) and 17th (Northern) divisions. The inexperience of corps and divisional commanders was exposed but the army hierarchy was efficient enough to remedy their worst failings, beginning the process of creating an effective army from the mass of civilian volunteers. The attacks were not set-piece offensives but mopping-up operations against particular localities to create the conditions for another set-piece attack, which had more success in consequence. Battalions from 17 German regiments of nine divisions fought in the area and the 3rd Guard Division suffered many casualties, the Regiment Lehr (the army demonstration battalion) almost being annihilated.

J. P. Harris, also in 2009, wrote that the Fourth Army had continued the offensive with the three corps on the right to close up to the second position but was too slow to occupy Mametz Wood before 4 July; Haig toured the corps headquarters urging them forward. Harris criticised the Fourth Army headquarters and the corps headquarters, for inadequately commanding the resulting operations. Corps commanders delegated to divisions, which sometimes delegated to battalion commanders and caused a lack of co-ordination. Attacks were supported by small amounts of artillery and attacks on narrow fronts created untenable salients that were vulnerable to crossfire from un-engaged units on the flanks, although German counter-attacks were just as prone to failure. The attacks on Contalmaison and the rest of the Fourth Army front cost the British 25,000 casualties but in the circumstances of early July, rushed and disjointed attacks might have been better than a delay to organise a deliberate attack, which could take a week allowing the defenders to recover. Harris suggested that from 2 to 4 July, the British lacked aggression. The attacks from 2 to 13 July added to German problems and closing up to the second position was a considerable, if costly, victory. The Germans found themselves in a meat grinder, when the British artillery was rapidly increasing in effectiveness, much assisted by RFC artillery-observation aircraft. German counter-attacks were even worse prepared than British equivalents and most were repulsed. The policy of resolute defence and counter-attack exposed many German units to British firepower and by 10 July, the Germans had suffered 40,197 casualties.

=== Casualties ===
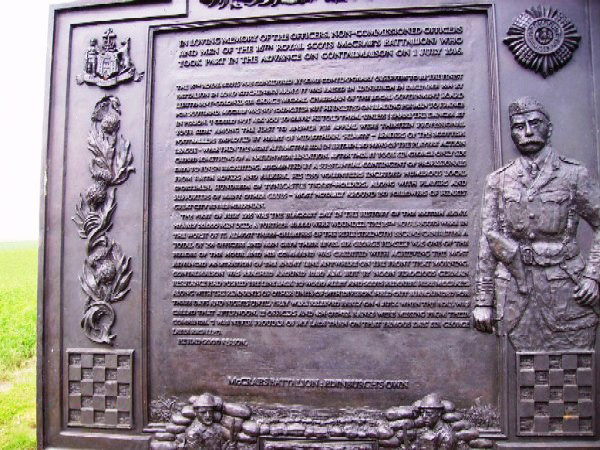
McCrae's Battalion Great War Memorial, commemorating the 16th Royal Scots

On 1 July, the 34th Division suffered the largest number of casualties of the British divisions engaged, suffering 6,380 casualties. The 15th Royal Scots suffered 513 casualties and the 16th Royal Scots 466. The Grimsby Chums lost 477 men and the 11th Suffolks had 527 casualties. In 1921, the 34th Division historian, J. Shakespear using records compiled just after the division was relieved, write that in three days, the 101st Brigade had suffered 2,299 casualties, the 102nd Brigade 2,324 casualties and the 103rd Brigade incurred 1,968. From 30 June – 3 July, the 21st Division had 4,663 casualties. The 23rd Division had 3,485 casualties to 10 July, the capture of Contalmaison cost the 69th Brigade 855 men and the 17th (Northern) Division suffered 4,771 casualties from 1 to 11 July.

=== Subsequent operations ===
Ovillers was re-captured by the Germans on 25 March 1918, after a retreat by the 47th (1/2nd London) Division and the 12th (Eastern) Division during Operation Michael, the German spring offensive. In the afternoon, air reconnaissance saw that the British defence of the line from Montauban and Ervillers was collapsing and the RFC squadrons in the area made a maximum effort to disrupt the German advance. The German garrison in the village ruins and vicinity resisted an attack on 24 August but were by-passed on both flanks by the 38th (Welsh) Division two days later, during the Second Battle of Bapaume and retreated before they could be surrounded.
