= Philip Robertson (British Army officer) =

Major-General Sir Philip Robertson KCB CMG
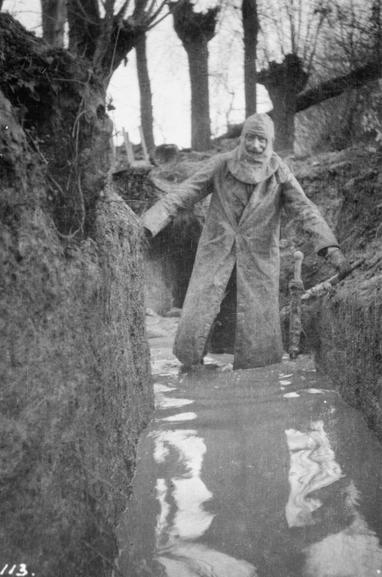
- Colonel Robertson, commanding officer of the 1st Battalion, Cameronians (Scottish Rifles), returning from a tour of his unit's positions in waterlogged trenches at Bois Grenier, January 1915
- Born: 5 April 1866
- Died: 11 May 1936 (aged 70)
- Military career
- Allegiance: United Kingdom
- Branch: British Army
- Service years: 1886–1923
- Rank: Major General
- Nickname: "Blobs"
- Unit: Cameronians (Scottish Rifles)
- Commands: 1st Battalion, Cameronians (Scottish Rifles); 19th Infantry Brigade; 17th (Northern) Division; 52nd (Lowland) Division
- Conflicts: First World War
- Awards: Knight Commander of the Order of the Bath; Companion of the Order of St Michael and St George

Major General Sir Philip Rynd Robertson KCB CMG (5 April 1866 – 11 May 1936) was a British Army officer of the late nineteenth and early twentieth centuries, who commanded a battalion, a brigade and then division in the First World War.

== Early career and family ==
Philip Rynd Robertson was born on 5 April 1866, the eldest surviving son of General J.H.C. Robertson. He was educated at Charterhouse School before entering the Royal Military College, Sandhurst. He passed out of Sandhurst in 1886, and was commissioned as a lieutenant in the Cameronians (Scottish Rifles) on 25 August.

He remained with his regiment for thirteen years, with a promotion to captain in October 1896, until he was appointed as the adjutant to a volunteer battalion in India in February 1899. While stationed in India, in 1897, he married Margaret Elizabeth Beresford, the daughter of John Stuart Beresford, chief engineer of the Punjab government. He returned to regimental duties in January 1904, having remained in India throughout the Second Boer War, and was promoted to major in September. In October 1913, he was promoted to lieutenant colonel and appointed to command the 1st Battalion of the Cameronians.

== First World War ==
On the outbreak of the First World War in August 1914, the 1st Cameronians were one of four independent battalions earmarked for service with the British Expeditionary Force (BEF) as line of communications troops. They landed in France on 11 August, and on 22 August all four were grouped into the 19th Infantry Brigade for frontline service. Under Robertson's command, the battalion first saw action on 23 August at the Battle of Mons, where the 19th Brigade held the far left of the British line, It served in reserve during the Battle of Le Cateau, covering the retreat of the 5th Division at the end of the day's fighting.

The battalion returned to the front in October, where it repulsed several heavy attacks, and remained in line during the winter of 1914–15, under the command of the 6th Division. In February 1915 Robertson was made a Companion of the Order of St Michael and St George. When the 6th Division was relieved by the 27th Division in late May 1915, the 19th Brigade remained in place and was transferred to the new division; shortly afterwards, on 15 June, Robertson was promoted to command the brigade, and along with it came the temporary rank of brigadier-general. He succeeded the Hon. Frederick Gordon, the brigade's former commander, who in turn had been promoted to command the 22nd Division. In August, the brigade was again transferred, to the 2nd Division, and under this new command it took part in the Battle of Loos in September.

At Loos, the brigade was under orders to attack behind a barrage of chlorine gas on 25 September, but early on the morning of the attack the wind changed. Robertson applied for permission to cancel the gas attack, but was refused, and it was released according to schedule; as a result, it lay in clouds along the trench line, some drifting back into the British positions. The subsequent attack was almost completely unsuccessful, at the cost of heavy casualties. A second assault on the 27th was ordered, but Robertson gave instructions that the infantry attack was to be held back until the gas could be seen to have effect; the gas failed a second time, and the attack was cancelled. The brigade did not see heavy action through the remainder of the battle, spending most of October in reserve, and in late November was transferred to the newly arrived 33rd Division. The following winter was mostly quiet, with occasional shelling and raids; on 2 January, the brigade HQ was bombarded with some casualties, though Robertson, promoted to brevet colonel on 1 January, appears to have been uninjured, and in early April, a battalion history notes that "the Brigadier's barber [was] wounded while he was cutting the Brigadier's hair" at HQ. In the spring, raiding resumed again, and in May the brigade took up a larger section of the line in order to free troops for the Somme offensive. On 22 June, the largest mine constructed by the Germans on the Western Front was detonated in this sector, with heavy casualties, and a retaliatory raid followed on 5 July; two days later, the division was ordered south to take part in the Battle of the Somme, which had begun on 1 July.

Before it moved into the line, Robertson relinquished command of the 19th Brigade; on 13 July he was promoted to temporary major general to take over from Thomas Pilcher the 17th (Northern) Division, which he would command for the rest of the war. He was made a Companion of the Order of the Bath (CB) in January 1917, while his permanent rank (that is, his rank in the Regular Army) was promoted to colonel in November, and major general in June 1918. In that same month he was made colonel of his regiment, the Cameronians.

== Later career and retirement ==
From June 1919 to June 1923 he commanded the 52nd (Lowland) Infantry Division, a formation of the Territorial Army, his last post before he retired from the army in June 1923.

Robertson retired to Bideford: there is a plaque to him within St Mary's church there.

== Notes ==
Military offices
Preceded by Thomas Pilcher	GOC 17th (Northern) Division; 1916–1919	Succeeded by Post disbanded
Preceded by Francis Marshall	GOC 52nd (Lowland) Infantry Division; 1919–1923	Succeeded by Hamilton Reed
