= Ella Pilcher =

British aviator

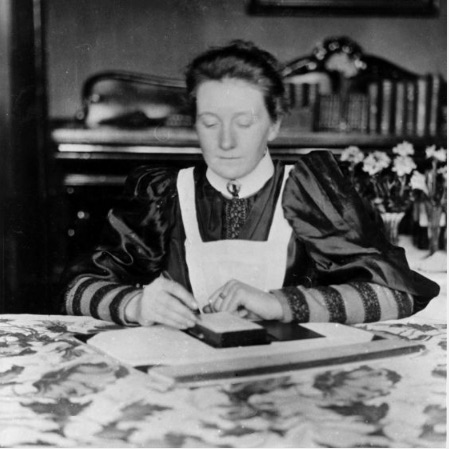
- Aviation pioneer Ella Pilcher, Glasgow c. 1895. Via Philip Jarrett.
- Born: 1863/4; Harrow, London, England
- Died: 19 May, 1939 (aged 73–74); Jersey
- Occupation: Aviator
- Known for: First woman to fly in a glider in the British Isles

Ella Sophia Gertrude Pilcher (c. 1863/4 - 19 May 1939) was a British pioneer aviator, and the first woman to fly in a glider in the British Isles. She co-created and flew in gliders designed by Percy Pilcher, her younger brother, in the 1890s and is considered to be the first woman who sewed wings. She was made an honorary member of the Royal Aeronautical Society in December 1899.

== Early life ==
Ella Pilcher was born in Harrow to a Scottish mother, Sophia (née Robinson), and Somerset-born father, Thomas Webb Pilcher. Her father was on his second marriage, having had a previous life as curator of a British gallery in Rome and husband of an Italian marchioness. He was in his sixties for most of his children's births and died in 1874. Sophia took Ella and her siblings Thomas, Ada Violet and Percy to Germany but then herself died only three years later. The orphans returned to England, the charges of the eldest brother Thomas Pilcher, who at 19 joined the army to pay for the schooling of his sisters. Percy was enrolled as a naval cadet at the age of 13 and upon graduation pursued an apprenticeship in the engineering department of a Glasgow shipyard. Ella went with Percy to Glasgow as his companion and housekeeper, while Ada Violet stayed south with Thomas.

Ella and Percy lived in a flat in Byres Road, Glasgow. Ella was, according to friends and family, a great singer.

== Gliding ==
Ella supported her brother's passionate interest in aeronautics which, she remembered, he had had since childhood. At Byres Road they kept birds in order to observe them in flight and landing. Percy followed the experiments of German pioneer glider Otto Lilienthal closely, and made scale models of gliders which he would fly around the apartment. In early 1895 the siblings decided to make a full sized prototype of what they called a 'soaring machine'. Percy did the design, carpentry and tensioning. Ella was in charge of the fabric. They moved house to Kersland Street, Glasgow (the landlady at Byres Road objected to the birds and the models), and began constructing the aircraft in five sections. They used the best materials they could get with their limited funds: pine, sailcloth, steel plates, piano wire and bamboo. It was difficult to lay out the fabric in order to cut and sew it at home, and they were lent a room at Glasgow University by its principal, the physicist Lord Kelvin, despite his friendly scepticism towards aeronautical progress. Ella was helped by Iris Biles, the daughter of the professor Percy assisted.

They called this first glider the Bat, and began test flying it at Cardross, farmland to the west of Glasgow, in the summer of 1895. By September of that year, taking advantage of the long university vacation, Ella and Percy had modified the Bat to the point where it would carry one of them aloft for 30 seconds, double that if towed by a rope. Percy did most of the test flying, but Ella took at least one tethered flight. They also worked on two other models, which did not turn out so well: the Beetle and the Gull. For the Gull, Ella managed to sew 300 square feet of sailcloth into the wings specified by Percy in less than a month.

Ella Pilcher appears with Percy and the gliders in over half of the photographs dating from 1895–6, which the siblings must have commissioned in order to send to the press. By the spring of 1896, the Pilchers had featured in a number of publications in Britain, the United States and Germany, though only Percy was ever mentioned by name. They were working on a new model, the Hawk, which would remain their highest achievement in aeronautics.

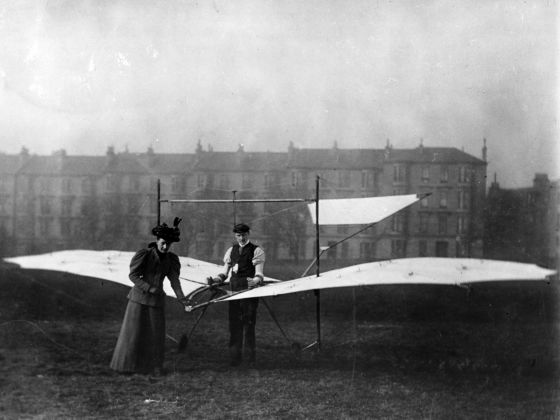
Aviation pioneers Ella and Percy Pilcher with their Hawk glider, Glasgow, 1896. Via Philip Jarrett.

She moved down to London when Percy was invited to join American-born arms magnate and aeronautical pioneer Hiram Maxim as his assistant in April 1896. Percy was given space at Maxim's flight test site at Eynsford in Kent to house and trial the Hawk. Ella helped Percy organise a demonstration of the Hawk on Sunday 20 June 1897 - Percy was hoping to find an investor to support him in developing and installing a motor in the glider. She oversaw the installation and operation of a rope pulley across the valley from Percy's launch site, and was instrumental in the success of the day, in which Percy achieved impressive tethered and free flights. One of the scientists who attended, phonograph enthusiast and fellow of the Meteorological Society Douglas Archibald, mentioned Ella in his account:

I hope I may be permitted to remark that Mr. Pilcher has been, fortunately, blessed with the possession of a sister, who not only acted as the presiding goddess of the tea-table on the present occasion, but actually made most of the wing surfaces with her own hands.

The demonstration also saw a (possibly unplanned) flight by Dorothy Rose Pilcher, Ella's cousin, who was given a tow by Percy but then crashed into the cinematograph camera which had been set up to take stills of the glider in flight. Neither the aviator nor the apparatus was damaged.

While it did not yield an investor, the demonstration was impressive enough for Percy to start up a company with a colleague, Walter Gordon Wilson. At this point Ella probably stepped back from her role as Percy's collaborator, and may have begun training as a nurse. Nonetheless, she still accompanied Percy on his most important trial flights, and helped him prepare for lectures.

In the late summer of 1899 another demonstration was planned, at Stanford Hall in Leicestershire, for the benefit of prospective investor John Henniker Heaton and a few others. Despite bad weather, Percy insisted on making a flight in the Hawk and suffered an accident. He died from his injuries three days later, Ella at his side. Within a month Ella had embarked for Cape Town to serve as a nurse in the Second Boer War.

Just weeks after Percy's death, Ella wrote to Robert Baden Powell, who had been a supporter of the Pilchers' gliding experiments and was de facto president of the Aeronautical Society of Great Britain (which was later renamed the Royal Aeronautical Society), requesting membership on her own behalf. "I should not like our name to be taken off your lists. As I always helped my dear brother in his experiments, I am able to take great interest in the subject." Five weeks later, she was voted an honorary member.

== Later life ==
Ella married Colonel Edward C. Tidswell in the autumn of 1902, and accompanied him on his stationing in Kumasi, now Ghana.

She donated Percy's models, sketches and photographs to the Royal Aeronautical Society that year, and went on to contribute an article about him to the Aeronautical Journal in 1909. Over a decade later she corresponded with the society again in order to offer more material and information about Percy, whose legacy she feared was being forgotten.

On her husband's retirement from military service, the couple moved to Jersey, where they lived at St Brelade's Bay. According to her niece, Ella was still running down hills in her seventies, teaching her great nephew to fly a kite, months before she died in 1939.
