= Percy Pilcher =

British inventor and aviator (1867–1899)

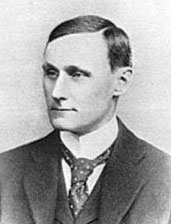
- Born: 16 January 1867; Bath, Somerset, England
- Died: 2 October 1899 (aged 32); Stanford, Northamptonshire
- Cause of death: Glider accident
- Burial place: Brompton Cemetery, London
- Occupation: Inventor
- Known for: Aviation pioneer

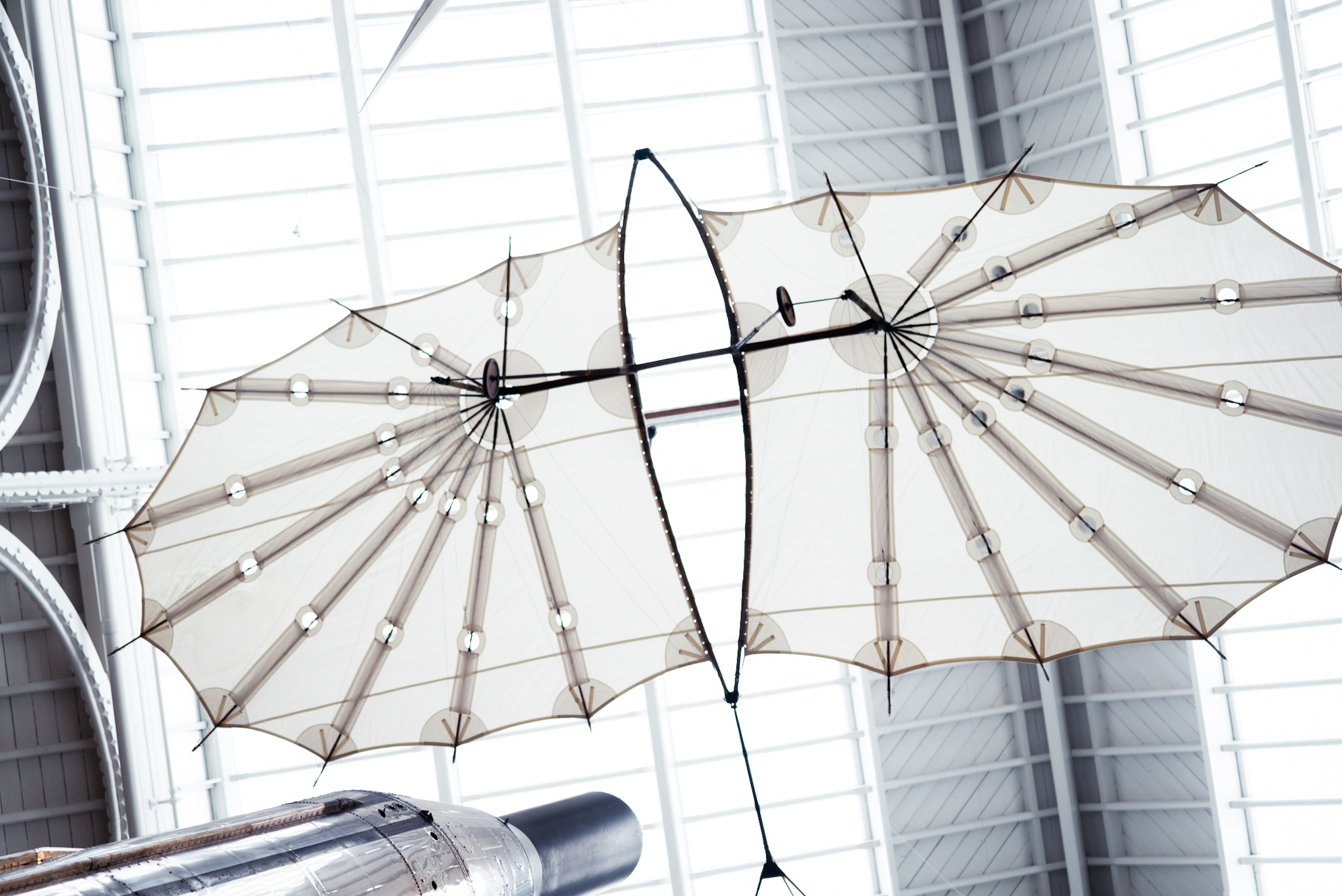
Pilcher's Hawk glider, restored after his fatal crash, on display in the National Museum of Scotland

Percy Sinclair Pilcher (16 January 1867 – 2 October 1899) was a British inventor and pioneer aviator who was his country's foremost experimenter in unpowered flight near the end of the nineteenth century.

After corresponding with Otto Lilienthal, Pilcher had considerable success with developing hang gliders. In 1895, he made repeated flights in the Bat, and in 1896–1897 many flights in the Hawk culminated in a world distance record.

By 1899, Pilcher had produced a motor-driven triplane, which he planned to test at Stanford Hall in Leicestershire on September 30, 1899; however, the attempt was delayed by mechanical problems. When he substituted a flight of Hawk, it suffered structural failure in mid-air and he was fatally injured in the resulting crash, with his powered aircraft never having been tested.

Research carried out by Cranfield University in the early 2000s concluded that Pilcher's triplane was more or less workable, and would have been capable of flight with design modifications. This raised the possibility that Pilcher could have been the first to fly a heavier-than-air powered aircraft had he survived.

== Early life ==
Percy Pilcher was born in Bath in 1867, the son of Thomas Webb Pilcher (1799–1874) and Scottish mother Sophia (née) Robinson. In 1880, at age 13 Pilcher became a cadet in the Royal Navy, and served for seven years. Thereafter he became an engineering apprentice with the shipbuilders, Randolph, Elder and Company, of Govan in Glasgow.

== Aviation career ==
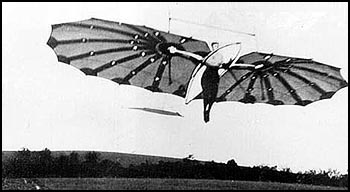
The hang glider Hawk, 1897. Shown might be Miss Dorothy Pilcher, Percy's cousin who was towed in a flight.

In 1891 Pilcher began work as assistant lecturer at Glasgow University and took a growing interest in aviation. He built a hang glider called The Bat which he flew for the first time in 1895;

Later that year Pilcher met Otto Lilienthal, who was the leading expert in gliding in Germany. These discussions led to Pilcher building two more gliders, The Beetle and The Gull. Based on the work of his mentor Otto Lilienthal, in 1895–1896 Pilcher built a glider called Hawk with which he broke the world distance record when he flew 250 m (820 ft) in 1897 on the grounds of Stanford Hall, Leicestershire. His sister Ella Pilcher was involved with his work, stitching the fabric wings of his planes and assisting with his experiments and test flights. She appears in photos taken at the time of Pilcher's public flights.

Pilcher set his sights on making powered flights. He developed a triplane that was to include a 4 hp (3 kW) engine. In order to develop a suitable internal combustion engine to power the aircraft, Pilcher teamed up with the motor engineer Walter Gordon Wilson, and created a company called Wilson-Pilcher. Wilson was later to become credited by the 1919 Royal Commission on Awards to Inventors as the co-inventor of the tank, along with Sir William Tritton. However, construction of the triplane put him heavily into debt, and Pilcher needed sponsorship to complete his work.

== Death ==
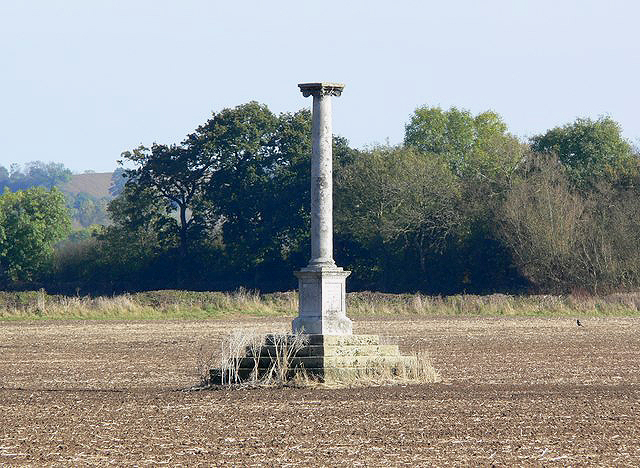
Monument near Stanford Hall, Leicestershire at the point where Pilcher crashed his glider (the monument is actually located just across the county boundary in Northamptonshire)

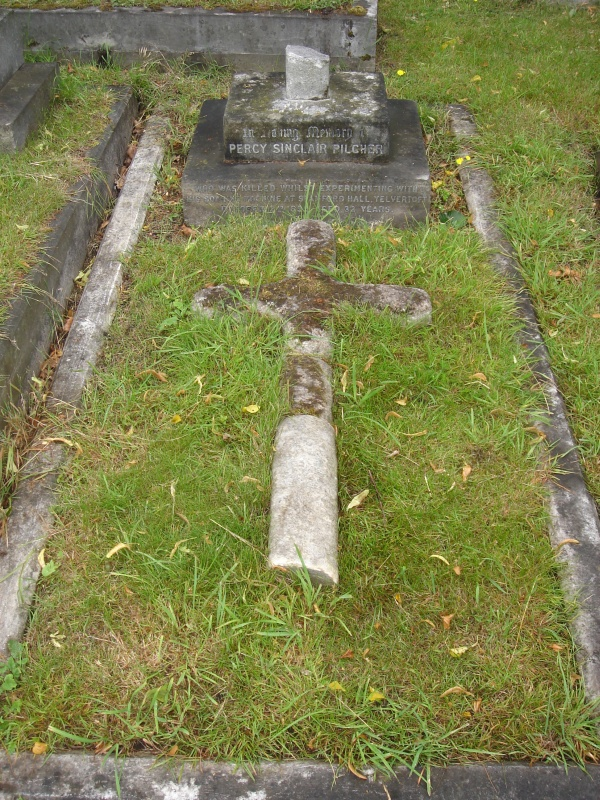
Funerary monument, Brompton Cemetery, London

On 30 September 1899, having completed his triplane, he had intended to demonstrate it to a group of onlookers and potential sponsors, including the eminent Member of Parliament John Henniker Heaton, in a field near Stanford Hall. However, days before, the engine crankshaft had broken and, so as not to disappoint his guests, he decided to fly the Hawk instead. The weather was stormy and rainy, but by 4 pm Pilcher decided the weather was good enough to fly. The canvas on the wings of the Hawk had become saturated by rain; unbeknown to Pilcher, this caused the fabric to contract putting excessive strain on the bamboo frame: Whilst in mid-air, the tail snapped and Pilcher plunged 10 metres (30 ft) to the ground: he died two days later from his injuries, having never regained consciousness, with his triplane having never been publicly flown.

He is buried in Brompton Cemetery, west London.

== Legacy ==
The damaged Hawk was given to the Aeronautical Society of Great Britain which exhibited it in that state, then in 1909 it was restored and given on loan to the Royal Scottish Museum in Chambers Street (now the main part of the National Museum of Scotland) which put the glider on display. It was on temporary loan to the 1911 Scottish Exhibition of National History, Art and Industry, when a November storm caused damage to the building, and to the glider which was repaired before being put on display again in the museum. During World War II, it was put in storage. The fabric wings deteriorated, and restoration work was carried out by the Shuttleworth Trust. Pilcher's Hawk was again put back on display in the museum. In 1985 this became part of National Museums Scotland, and the Hawk became part of the collection of its National Museum of Flight at East Fortune. Further major conservation work was completed in the summer of 2016, and it is back again on display in its usual place, suspended above the atrium of the Science and Technology galleries of the National Museum of Scotland.

A stone monument to Pilcher stands in the field near Stanford Hall at the point where he crashed, and a full-sized replica of his Hawk glider is also displayed at Stanford Hall.

Pilcher is one of the unsuccessful aviation pioneers mentioned in the Marc Blitzstein composition The Airborne Symphony.

In 2011, he was one of seven inaugural inductees to the Scottish Engineering Hall of Fame.

== Modern research ==
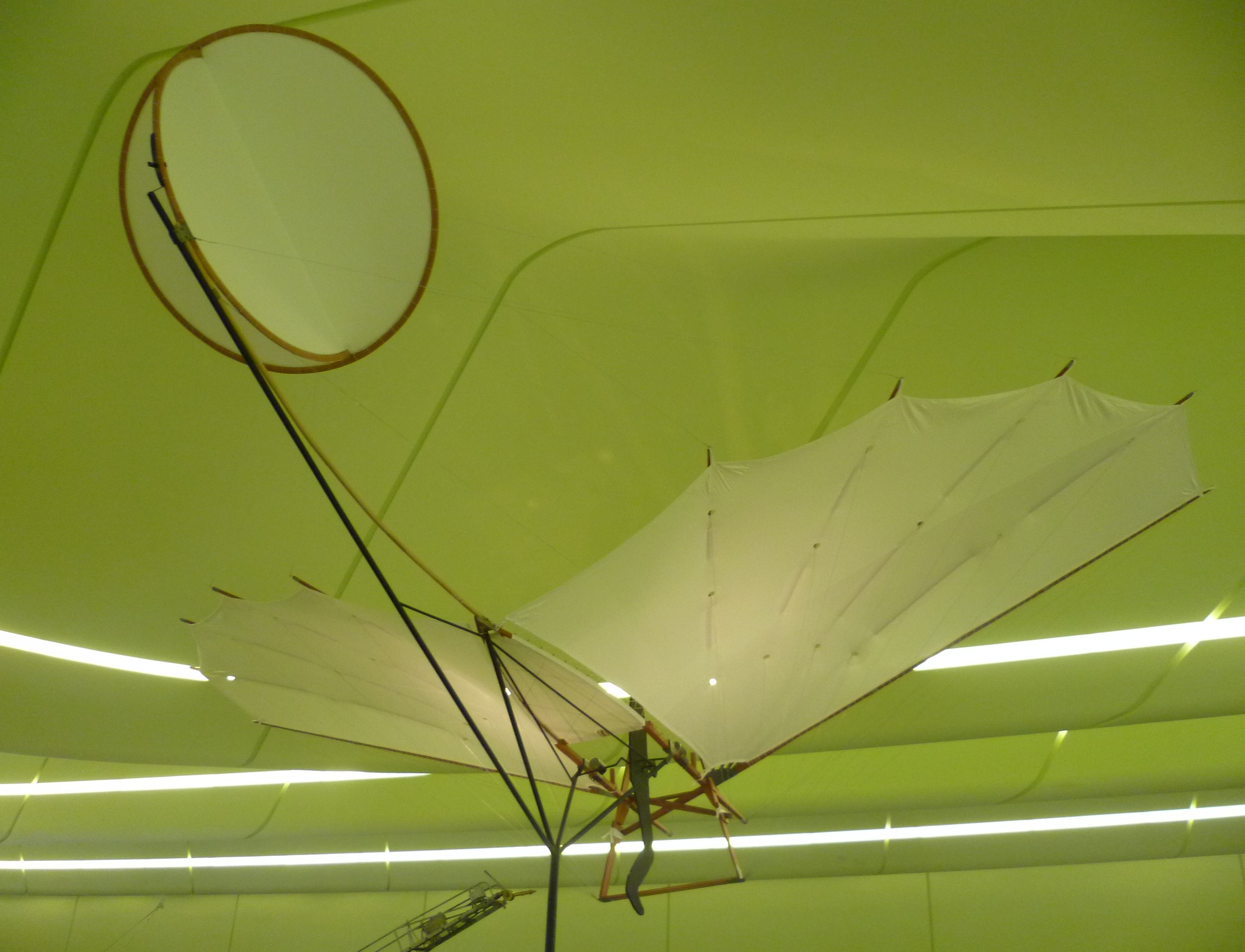
Replica of the Bat in Glasgow's Riverside Museum

Pilcher's plans were lost for many years, and his name was also long forgotten except by a few enthusiasts. When the centenary of the Wright brothers' flight approached, a new effort was made to find the lost work, and some correspondence was found in a private American collection. From this it was possible to discern the general direction of his plans and the basis of his design. Based on Lilienthal's work, Pilcher understood how to produce lift using winglike structures, but at this time a full mathematical description was years away, so many elements were still missing.

In particular, Pilcher was stuck trying to design a wing that could lift the weight of an engine, the aircraft itself and the occupant – each increase in wing area increased the weight so much that yet more lift was required, requiring a larger wing – a seemingly vicious circle. Pilcher's breakthrough, thanks to correspondence with another pioneer, Octave Chanute, was to stack smaller, lighter wings one atop the other in an arrangement we know today as the biplane or triplane. This allowed the wings to generate much more lift without a corresponding increase in weight.

In 2003, a research effort carried out at the School of Aeronautics at Cranfield University, commissioned by the BBC2 television series Horizon, has shown that Pilcher's design was more or less workable, and had he been able to develop his engine, it is possible he would have succeeded in being the first to fly a heavier-than-air powered aircraft with some degree of control.

Cranfield built a full-sized working replica of Pilcher's aircraft, but, based on wind tunnel tests with a scale model, they made several alterations to Pilcher's original designs, which they speculated Pilcher would have made, including filling in cut-away sections of the wings to increase the wing area, and therefore lift, and adding a swinging seat to aid control of the aircraft through shifting body weight; a refinement developed by Octave Chanute, which they believed Pilcher would have been aware of. They also added the Wright brothers' innovation of wing-warping as a safety backup for roll control. Pilcher's original design did not include aerodynamic controls such as ailerons or elevators. After a very short initial test flight piloted by the aircraft designer Bill Brookes, the craft achieved a sustained flight of 1 minute and 25 seconds, compared to 59 seconds for the Wright Brothers' best flight at Kitty Hawk in North Carolina. This was achieved under dead calm conditions as an additional safety measure; the Wrights in 1903 flew in a 20 mph+ wind to achieve sufficient airspeed.

A monument to Percy Pilcher is located at Upper Austin Lodge to the south of Eynsford, Kent. He regularly flew his Hawk glider from this location.

== See also ==
- Aviation history
- Pilcher Peak

== Bibliography ==
- Jarrett, Philip (1987). Another Icarus: Percy Pilcher and the Quest for Flight. Washington: Smithsonian Institution Press. ISBN 9780874745566.
- Jarrett, Philip (1996). "Soaring Inspiration: Otto Lilienthal's Influence in Britain". Air Enthusiast. No. 65. pp. 2–7. ISSN 0143-5450.
- Brooks, Peter W. (9 March 1956). "A British Gliding Pioneer: The Experiments of Percy Pilcher". Flight. pp. 270–271. ISSN 2059-3864. Archived from the original (PDF) on 23 April 2014.
