= 28th Reserve Division =

28th Reserve Division (28. Reserve-Division)
- Active: 1914-1919
- Country: Germany
- Branch: Army
- Type: Infantry
- Size: Approx. 15,000
- Engagements: World War I: Battle of the Frontiers, Race to the Sea, Battle of the Somme, Second Battle of the Aisne, Third Battle of the Aisne, Battle of Belleau Wood, Champagne-Marne, Aisne-Marne Offensive, Battle of Saint-Mihiel, Meuse-Argonne Offensive

The 28th Reserve Division (28. Reserve-Division) was a unit of the Imperial German Army in World War I. The division was formed in August 1914, following the mobilization of the German Army as part of the XIV Reserve Corps. The division was disbanded in 1919 during the demobilization of the German Army after World War I. The division was raised primarily in the Grand Duchy of Baden.

== Combat chronicle ==
The 28th Reserve Division spent World War I on the Western Front. It fought in the Battle of the Frontiers and then participated in the Race to the Sea, fighting in the Somme region. It occupied the line in the Artois region from October 1914 to August 1916, and then fought in the Battle of the Somme. From October 1916 to April 1917, the division occupied the line near Verdun. It then went to the Chemin des Dames region and fought in the Second Battle of the Aisne—also known as the Third Battle of Champagne (and to the Germans as the Double Battle on the Aisne and in the Champagne). After a month back in Verdun, the division remained mainly in the Champagne region. In 1918, after being retrained and reorganized as an assault division, it fought in several German offensives and against the Allied offensives and counteroffensives. The division was heavily engaged against the Americans in this period, fighting in the Third Battle of the Aisne, the Battle of Belleau Wood, the Champagne-Marne Offensive, the Aisne-Marne Offensive, the Battle of Saint-Mihiel, and the Meuse-Argonne Offensive. Allied intelligence rated the division as mediocre in 1917, but, by 1918, it was rated as first class, one of the best divisions in the German Army.

== Order of battle on mobilization ==
The order of battle of the 28th Reserve Division on mobilization was as follows:

- 55. Reserve-Infanterie-Brigade
  - Reserve-Infanterie-Regiment Nr. 40
  - Badisches Reserve-Infanterie-Regiment Nr. 109
  - Reserve-Jäger-Bataillon Nr. 8
- 56. Reserve-Infanterie-Brigade
  - Badisches Reserve-Infanterie-Regiment Nr. 110
  - Badisches Reserve-Infanterie-Regiment Nr. 111
  - Reserve-Jäger-Bataillon Nr. 14
- Reserve-Dragoner-Regiment Nr. 8
- Reserve-Feldartillerie-Regiment Nr. 29
- 1. Reserve-Kompanie/Württembergisches Pionier-Bataillon Nr. 13
- 2. Reserve-Kompanie/Württembergisches Pionier-Bataillon Nr. 13

== Order of battle on January 1, 1918 ==
The 28th Reserve Division was triangularized in April 1915, sending the 40th Reserve Infantry Regiment to the 115th Infantry Division. Over the course of the war, other organizational changes took place, including the formation of artillery and signals commands and a pioneer battalion. The order of battle on January 1, 1918, was as follows:

- 56. Reserve-Infanterie-Brigade
  - Badisches Reserve-Infanterie-Regiment Nr. 109
  - Badisches Reserve-Infanterie-Regiment Nr. 110
  - Badisches Reserve-Infanterie-Regiment Nr. 111
- 4. Eskadron/3. badisches Dragoner-Regiment Prinz Karl Nr. 22
- Artillerie-Kommandeur 144
  - Reserve-Feldartillerie-Regiment Nr. 29
  - II./1. Garde-Fußartillerie-Regiment (from May 27, 1918)
- Pionier-Bataillon Nr. 328
  - 4. Kompanie/1. Lothringisches Pionier-Bataillon Nr. 16
  - 1. Ersatz-Kompanie/1. Lothringisches Pionier-Bataillon Nr. 16
  - Minenwerfer-Kompanie Nr. 228
- Divisions-Nachrichten-Kommandeur 428

== Winterberg tunnel ==
On May 4, 1917, the 10th and 11th Companies of Badisches Reserve-Infanterie-Regiment Nr. 111 were trapped in the Winterberg tunnel near Craonne. Of the 273 men, only 3 survived. 6 days later, the de facto tomb was resealed. In March 2021, the tunnel was rediscovered after nearly 104 years.
