= List of New Zealand Victoria Cross recipients =

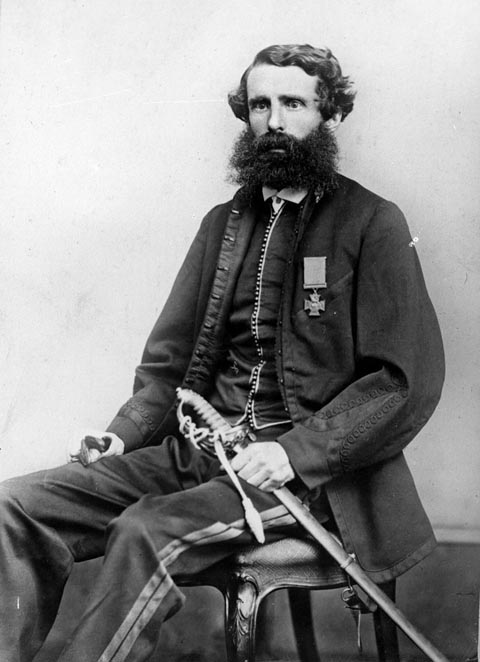
Charles Heaphy, New Zealand's first Victoria Cross recipient

The Victoria Cross is a military decoration awarded for valour of the British and Commonwealth forces. The highest and most prestigious award for gallantry in the face of the enemy, it was first instituted by Queen Victoria in 1856 after the Crimean War. Officially there have been 22 Imperial Victoria Crosses awarded to New Zealand military personnel. These awards were bestowed upon 21 individuals, with Charles Upham receiving the award on two occasions.

== Background ==
Established in 1856, the Victoria Cross has been awarded to service personnel for extraordinary valour and devotion to duty while facing a hostile force. Between 1858 and 1881 the Victoria Cross could also be awarded for actions taken "under circumstances of extreme danger" not in the face of the enemy. Six people (four Irish, one English and one Canadian) were awarded Victoria Crosses under this clause (one in 1866 during the Fenian raids, five for a single incident in 1867 during the Andaman Islands Expedition), until it was amended in 1881 to only allow acts "in the presence of the enemy".

In 1999 the Victoria Cross for New Zealand was created as a separate version of the award solely for New Zealand personnel. To date, there has been one recipient of that award – Willie Apiata for actions in Afghanistan in 2004 – although recipients of the Victoria Cross for New Zealand are not included on this list.

== Summary ==
The first award to a New Zealander came in 1864 when Charles Heaphy received a Victoria Cross for his actions during the Invasion of Waikato during the New Zealand Wars. Since then there has been one award to a New Zealander serving during the Second Boer War, 11 during World War I, and nine in World War II. There were no awards to New Zealanders for service during the Korean War or the Vietnam War.

In addition to the 22 awards to New Zealand military personnel, there have been seven other awards to New Zealanders serving in overseas forces, which are not included in the official count. Of these, the majority served with the Australian forces during the First World War, including: Alfred Shout, Percy Storkey, Lawrence Weathers, and Thomas Cooke, all of whom are listed as Australian recipients. New Zealand's most famous soldier, Bernard Freyberg is sometimes listed as a New Zealand recipient, although he was serving in the British Army when he performed the deeds that led to his award in 1916, and is not included in the official count. William Barnard Rhodes-Moorhouse received the award posthumously for service with the Royal Flying Corps in 1915, while William Edward Sanders, commanding HMS Prize, received the award for actions at sea in 1917 while serving in the Royal Navy Reserve. An eighth, Cecil D'Arcy (born in Wanganui), who served during the Anglo-Zulu War in 1879, is variously listed as a New Zealand or South African recipient, but is not officially included on the list of New Zealanders who received the award in overseas forces.

== Recipients ==
- This along with the *, indicates that the Victoria Cross was awarded posthumously

Name	Date of action	Conflict	Unit	Place of action	Notes
Leslie Andrew	1917	First World War	Wellington Infantry Regiment	La Basse Ville, Belgium	
Cyril Bassett	1915	First World War	New Zealand Divisional Signal Company	Gallipoli, Turkey	
Donald Brown	1916	First World War	Otago Infantry Regiment	High Wood, France	(Note: Brown died in action three weeks after the action that led to his award.)
James Crichton	1918	First World War	Auckland Infantry Regiment	Crèvecœur, France	
Keith Elliott	1942	Second World War	22nd Battalion	Ruweisat, Egypt	
Samuel Forsyth	1918*	First World War	New Zealand Engineers	Grévillers, France	
Samuel Frickleton	1917	First World War	New Zealand Rifle Brigade	Messines, Belgium	
John Grant	1918	First World War	Wellington Infantry Regiment	Bancourt, France	
William Hardham	1901	Second Boer War	4th New Zealand Contingent	Naauwpoort, South Africa	
Charles Heaphy	1864	New Zealand Wars	Auckland Militia	Mangapiko River, New Zealand	
John Hinton	1941	Second World War	20th Battalion	Kalamai, Greece	
Alfred Hulme	1941	Second World War	23rd Battalion	Crete, Greece	
Reginald Judson	1918	First World War	Auckland Infantry Regiment	Bapaume, France	
Harry Laurent	1918	First World War	New Zealand Rifle Brigade	Gouzeaucourt Wood, France	
Moana-Nui-a-Kiwa Ngarimu	1943*	Second World War	28th Battalion	Tebaga Gap, Tunisia	
Henry Nicholas	1917	First World War	Canterbury Infantry Regiment	Polderhoek, Belgium	
Richard Travis	1918*	First World War	Otago Infantry Regiment	Rossignol Wood, France	
Leonard Trent	1943	Second World War	No. 487 Squadron RNZAF	Amsterdam, Netherlands	
Lloyd Trigg	1943*	Second World War	No. 200 Squadron RAF	Atlantic	
Charles Upham	1941; 1942	Second World War	20th Battalion	Crete, Greece (1941); Ruweisat Ridge, Egypt (1942)	(Note: Upham is one of only three people to have received the Victoria Cross twice.)
James Ward	1941*	Second World War	No. 75 Squadron RNZAF	Munster, Germany	
