= Linton Military Camp =

New Zealand Army base

- Palmerston North, New Zealand
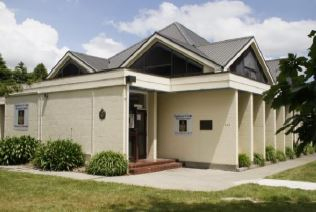
- Museum building of Engineering Corps Memorial Centre

Site information
- Type: Army Camp
- Owner: New Zealand Defence Force
- Controlled by: New Zealand Army

Location
- Coordinates: 40.408°S 175.587°E
- Area: 4.98 km^{2} (1.92 sq mi)

Site history
- Built: 1941
- In use: 1941–present

Garrison information
- Current commander: Colonel Brett Wellington

Linton Military Camp is the largest New Zealand Army base and is home to the Headquarters 1 (NZ) Brigade. It is located just south of Palmerston North.

Manawatu Prison is located north of the camp.

== History ==
The land that the present Linton Military Camp stands on was purchased by the Government in 1941 for use as a camp for Territorial and other home defence forces, with the first units taking up occupation in tented accommodation in February 1942, with the first prefabricated huts erected in August 1942. Unlike Burnham and Papakura, Linton was not initially intended to be mobilisation camp and as such was provided with minimal facilities. As the war intensified and the threat from Japan increased and the use of infrastructure in Palmerston North for defence purposes stretched to the limit, the decision was made to bring Linton up to the same standard as Burnham and Papakura. Deliberately designed as a precaution against air attack Linton camp was designed with nine Battalion Blocks, with only eight being completed each with a;

- parade ground,
- accommodation
- cookhouse,
- mess building, and
- ablutions.

Wartime construction was completed in 1945, and included;

- 182 Permanent buildings,
- 521 two-men huts,
- 155 four-men huts,
- 480 eight-men huts,
- a power plant,
- water and sewage reticulation,
- rifle ranges,
- assault courses
- magazines.
- Railway siding.

In March 2024, the National-led coalition government confirmed plans to upgrade Linton Camp's dilapidated barracks as the first project in the government's new flagship public-private infrastructure financing programme.

== Alternative Names ==
Linton Camp was accepted in general usage from 1943, with the names Camp Manawatu or Camp Kairanga used earlier. Camp Ravenswood or Camp Whitmore were considered as new names in the 1960s, but uses of these names never eventuated.

== Demographics ==
Linton Camp statistical area covers 4.97 km^{2} (1.92 sq mi) and had an estimated population of 1,150 as of June 2025, with a population density of 231 people per km^{2}.

Historical population
Year	Pop.	±% p.a.
2006	1,752	—
2013	1,383	−3.32%
2018	1,713	+4.37%
2023	1,062	−9.12%
The 2006 population is for a larger area of 4.98 km^{2}. Source:

Linton Camp had a population of 1,062 in the 2023 New Zealand census, a decrease of 651 people (−38.0%) since the 2018 census, and a decrease of 321 people (−23.2%) since the 2013 census. There were 726 males and 333 females in 216 dwellings. 3.7% of people identified as LGBTIQ+. The median age was 25.0 years (compared with 38.1 years nationally). There were 198 people (18.6%) aged under 15 years, 567 (53.4%) aged 15 to 29, 276 (26.0%) aged 30 to 64, and 21 (2.0%) aged 65 or older.

People could identify as more than one ethnicity. The results were 75.4% European (Pākehā); 41.8% Māori; 11.0% Pasifika; 4.0% Asian; 1.1% Middle Eastern, Latin American and African New Zealanders (MELAA); and 2.3% other, which includes people giving their ethnicity as "New Zealander". English was spoken by 93.2%, Māori by 9.3%, Samoan by 1.7%, and other languages by 5.4%. No language could be spoken by 5.4% (e.g. too young to talk). New Zealand Sign Language was known by 0.8%. The percentage of people born overseas was 14.1, compared with 28.8% nationally.

Religious affiliations were 26.3% Christian, 0.6% Hindu, 0.6% Islam, 1.7% Māori religious beliefs, 0.3% Buddhist, 0.3% New Age, 0.3% Jewish, and 2.0% other religions. People who answered that they had no religion were 61.6%, and 6.8% of people did not answer the census question.

Of those at least 15 years old, 114 (13.2%) people had a bachelor's or higher degree, 669 (77.4%) had a post-high school certificate or diploma, and 78 (9.0%) people exclusively held high school qualifications. The median income was $53,400, compared with $41,500 nationally. 27 people (3.1%) earned over $100,000 compared to 12.1% nationally. The employment status of those at least 15 was 603 (69.8%) full-time, 69 (8.0%) part-time, and 18 (2.1%) unemployed.

== Education ==
Linton Camp School is a co-educational full state primary school, with a roll of 147 as of July 2026. It opened in 1964.

Linton Country School operated nearby from 1889 to 2023.

== Current units based at Linton ==
=== 1st (New Zealand) Brigade ===
HQ 1 (NZ) Brigade commands the NZ Army's field forces day to day (excluding special forces) and prepares them for operations.

- Headquarters, 1st (NZ) Brigade

==== Combat Units ====
- 1st Battalion, Royal New Zealand Infantry Regiment
  - Alpha Company
  - Victor Company
  - Whiskey Company
  - Support Company
  - Combat Service Support Company
- Queen Alexandra's Mounted Rifles
  - Wellington East Coast Squadron
  - NZ Scots Squadron
  - Waikato Mounted Rifles Squadron
  - Support Squadron

==== Combat Support Units ====
- 16th Field Regiment, Royal Regiment of New Zealand Artillery
  - 161 Battery
  - 163 Battery
- 2nd Engineer Regiment
  - HQ Squadron
  - 2 Field Squadron (Combat Engineers)
  - 25 Engineer Support Squadron
  - Emergency Response Squadron
- 1st Command Support Regiment
  - Headquarter, 1st Command Support Regiment, Royal New Zealand Corps of Signals
  - 2nd Signal Squadron
  - 25 Cypher Section

==== Combat Service Support Units ====
- 2nd Combat Service Support Battalion, Royal New Zealand Army Logistic Regiment
  - Headquarters, 2nd Combat Service Support Battalion
  - 10th Transport Company
  - 21st Supply Company
  - 2nd Workshop Company
  - 5th Movements Company
  - 38 Combat Service Support Company
- 2nd Health Services Battalion (New Zealand)
  - Headquarters, 2nd Health Services Battalion (NZ)
  - 2nd Health Support Company
  - General Support Health Company
  - Logistics Support Company
- Linton Regional Support Centre (Linton Military Camp)

=== Headquarters Training and Doctrine Command ===
Training and Doctrine Command (TRADOC) trains and educates Army's personnel; develops leaders; establishes training standards; manages doctrine; integrates lessons learned and training support across the Army.

- Mission Command Training School
- Collective Training Center
- Land Operations Training Center (Palmerston North)
- School of Military Engineering

=== Lockheed Martin New Zealand ===
Lockheed Martin New Zealand provides logistics services for the NZDF including Maintenance, Repair, and Overhaul, Managed Fleet Utilisation and warehousing.

- Maintenance, Repair and Overhaul team
- Managed Fleet Utilisation team
- Ration Pack Production Facility

=== Other Units ===
- Joint Military Police Unit Linton
- Joint Logistic Support Agency service center
- Human Resources service center

== Incidents ==
A building belonging to the Ordnance Depot was gutted by fire on 18 February 1953

On Saturday 9 June 1956, fanned by an easterly breeze, a fire destroyed the Linton Military Camp cinema.

In October 2012, a series of shots were fired by an armed soldier, believed to be under the influence of alcohol, he then barricaded himself inside a house on the base. The NZ Police Armed Offenders Squad responded as well as the Military Police. After a five-hour siege, the police originally reported the man was apprehended, but later revealed he had committed suicide.

== Barracks ==
Linton Camps barracks are named after New Zealand Recipients of the Victoria Cross.

Andrew Barracks	1917	First World War	Wellington Infantry Regiment	La Basse Ville, Belgium
Bassett Barracks	1915	First World War	New Zealand Divisional Signal Company	Gallipoli, Turkey
Brown Barracks	1916	First World War	Otago Infantry Regiment	High Wood, France
Crichton Barracks	1918	First World War	Auckland Infantry Regiment	Crèvecœur, France
Cooke Barracks	1916	First World War	8th Battalion, Australian Imperial Force	Pozieres, France
D'Arcy Barracks	1879	Anglo-Zulu War	Frontier Light Horse	Ulundi, South Africa
Elliott Barracks	1942	Second World War	22nd Battalion	Ruweisat, Egypt
Forsyth Barracks	1918*	First World War	Royal New Zealand Engineers	Grévillers, France
Frickleton Barracks	1917	First World War	New Zealand Rifle Brigade	Messines, Belgium
Grant Barracks	1918	First World War	Wellington Infantry Regiment	Bancourt, France
Hardham Barracks	1901	Second Boer War	4th New Zealand Contingent	Naauwpoort, South Africa
Heaphy Barracks	1864	New Zealand Wars	Auckland Militia	Mangapiko River, New Zealand
Hinton Barracks	1941	Second World War	20th Battalion	Kalamai, Greece
Hulme Barracks	1941	Second World War	23rd Battalion	Crete, Greece
Judson Barracks	1918	First World War	Auckland Infantry Regiment	Bapaume, France
Laurent Barracks	1918	First World War	New Zealand Rifle Brigade	Gouzeaucourt Wood, France
Ngarimu Barracks	1943*	Second World War	28th Battalion	Tebaga Gap, Tunisia
Nicholas Barracks	1917	First World War	Canterbury Infantry Regiment	Polderhoek, Belgium
Shout Barracks	1915	Alfred Shout	1st Battalion, AIF	Gallipoli, Turkey
Storkey Barracks	1918	First World War	19th Battalion, AIF	Hangard Wood, France
Travis Barracks	1918*	First World War	Otago Infantry Regiment	Rossignol Wood, France
Upham Barracks	1941 1942	Second World War	20th Battalion	Crete, Greece (1941) Ruweisat Ridge, Egypt (1942)
Weathers Barracks	1918	First World War	43rd Battalion, AIF	Mont Saint-Quentin. France

== See also ==
- Burnham, New Zealand
- Hopuhopu Camp
- Papakura Military Camp
- Trentham Military Camp
- Waiouru Military Camp
