= Frickleton =

Frickleton is a surname. Notable people with the surname include:

- Joe Frickleton (c.1935–2020), Scottish football player and manager
- Samuel Frickleton (1891–1971), New Zealand Army officer
