= Second Battle of Bapaume =

Part of the Hundred Days Offensive of World War I

- Part of the Hundred Days Offensive of World War I
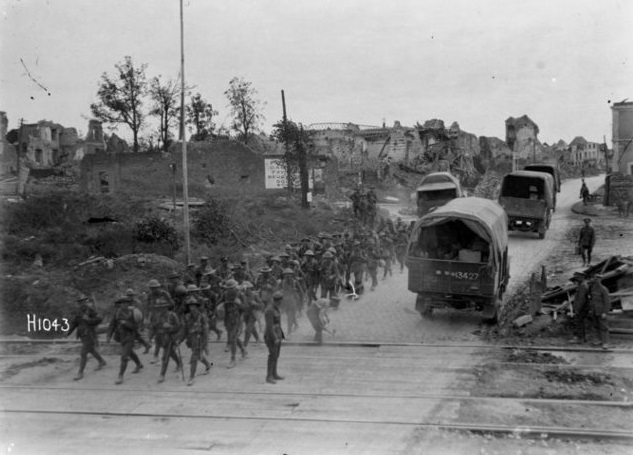
- A New Zealand infantry battalion passing through recaptured Bapaume, 14 September 1918
Date	21 August – 3 September 1918
Location	Bapaume, France
Result	Allied victory

Belligerents
British Empire: United Kingdom of Great Britain and Ireland; New Zealand	German Empire

Commanders and leaders
(United Kingdom of Great Britain and Ireland) George Harper	(German Empire) Otto von Below

The Second Battle of Bapaume was a battle of the First World War that took place at Bapaume in France, from 21 August 1918 to 3 September 1918. It was a continuation of the Battle of Albert and is also referred to as the second phase of that battle. The British and Dominion attack was part of what was later known as the Allies' Hundred Days Offensive.

The Second Battle of Bapaume was carried out over a period of two weeks and involved the divisions of IV Corps; the British 5th, 37th, 42nd, and the 63rd Divisions along with the New Zealand Division. On 29 August, elements of the New Zealand Division, after heavy fighting in the days prior, occupied Bapaume as the defending Germans withdrew. It then pushed onto the Bancourt Ridge, to the east of Bapaume.

== Background ==
On 8 August 1918, the Hundred Days' Offensive commenced on the Western Front and it would prove to be the last major campaign of the First World War. It began with the Battle of Amiens, an attack by the Canadian and Australian Corps at Amiens, which rolled the German lines back 8 km (5.0 mi). The advance petered out after four days after the Germans began to regroup and shore up their defences. The commander of the British Expeditionary Force, Field Marshal Douglas Haig, recognised that it was time to put pressure elsewhere on the German front and for this, decided to use General Julian Byng's Third Army. Haig decided that the Bapaume sector, with the town of Bapaume at its centre, was to be the new focus of operations.

=== Bapaume ===
Bapaume itself was a small town linked by rail to Albert and Arras. There were also four major roads running through the town; running to Albert in the south-west, to Peronne in the south-east; to Cambrai in the east and to the north lay Arras. Captured by the forces of Imperial Germany in the early stages of the war, it had been the focus of the British forces on the opening day of the Battle of Somme in 1916. Still in German hands, it had been largely destroyed in early 1917 following their withdrawal to the Hindenburg Line. Extensive booby traps had also been left and these troubled the Australians that moved into the town afterwards. It was subsequently recaptured by the Germans during the Spring Offensive. The land surrounding Bapaume was relatively flat and thus was conducive to the use of tanks.

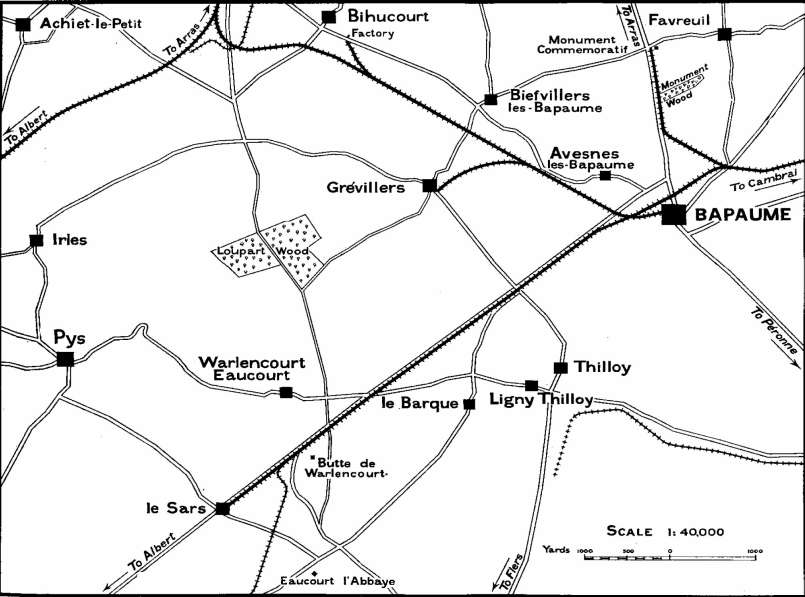
Bapaume and surrounds, August 1918

== Plan of attack ==
Byng allocated the Third Army's IV Corps to the forthcoming operation, which was to become known as the Second Battle of Bapaume. (Note: The battle was fought from 21 August to 2 September; however, the British Battles Nomenclature Committee designated the fighting that took place from 21 August to 29 August as the Battle of Albert while the Second Battle of Bapaume was deemed to cover the period 31 August to 3 September. However, Haig referred to the Battle of Bapaume as covering the period from 21 August to 2 September.) IV Corps, commanded by Lieutenant General George Harper comprised five divisions, all of which would be employed during the battle. The first three to be involved were the New Zealand Division along with the 37th and 42nd Divisions. The other two divisions, the 5th and the 63rd Divisions, were held in reserve before being deployed later in the battle. Of all these divisions, only the New Zealand Division was at full strength. Facing the Third Army was the German 17th Army, commanded by General der Infanterie (General of the Infantry) Otto von Below, made up of eight divisions which, apart from the 4th Bavarian Infantry Division, were all second class formations. A further two divisions were in reserve.

The battle was planned to have two phases. The first, what is now known as the Battle of Albert, was to be an attack across a 15 km (9.3 mi) front from the village of Puiseux towards the Albert–Arras railway. The New Zealand Division, commanded by Major General Andrew Russell, played a limited role in this action, being limited to the New Zealand Rifle Brigade supporting the main attack which was to be carried out by the 37th Division on 21 August. The New Zealanders, along with the 42nd Division, on its right, were expected to bring the right flank in line with the left. Then the 5th and 63rd were to pass through the lines of the 37th Division and move onto and beyond the Albert-Arras railway. The New Zealand Division and 42nd were to move forward and maintain the front line, which gradually narrowed, placing the New Zealanders in a valley with the high ground on either side occupied by its flanking British divisions.

The second phase, scheduled to begin on 23 August, was to capture Bapaume and then advance further east to Reincourt-les-Bapaume and Bancourt-Fremicourt and the high ground beyond. The New Zealanders were to play a key role; the 1st and 2nd Infantry Brigades of the New Zealand Division, kept in reserve, were to be ready to exploit any breakthrough on the front. To distract the Germans from the main attack being carried out by the Third Army, the French Tenth Army conducted diversionary attacks to the south.

== Battle ==
=== Albert–Arras railway ===
The opening phase of the battle began on 21 August, when two battalions of the New Zealand Rifle Brigade, covered by artillery and fog which reduced visibility to less than 100 m (110 yd), moved forward and seized Puiseux, capturing over 100 prisoners. It established a new line 1,000 m (1,100 yd) beyond the village and secured the flanks of the neighbouring divisions making their own move forwards. The British 5th Division then passed through the brigade's positions to take over the advance. It struggled to take its objective of Achiet-le-Petit and a feature known as the Dovecot and assistance, in the form of patrols mounted by the Rifle Brigade battalions, was provided. Nonetheless, the 5th Division had advanced 3.2 km (2.0 mi) and took over 500 prisoners of war for relatively few casualties.

Little progress was made the next day as Byng directed that the focus for the day was to simply consolidate the gains made and prepare for a further movement forward on 23 August. The relative inactivity of 22 August encouraged von Below in a belief that the attacks of the previous day were a failure. Seeking to take advantage, he arranged for counterattacks to be mounted by the 17th Army, and these resulted in the loss of Dovecot, which overlooked the New Zealand positions. The machine gun battalion of 42nd Division provided key support in driving off the counterattacks which, according to prisoners of war captured during the action, was launched by 52nd Infantry Division, largely made up of men from the Grand Duchy of Baden, which had newly arrived in the sector from Flanders.

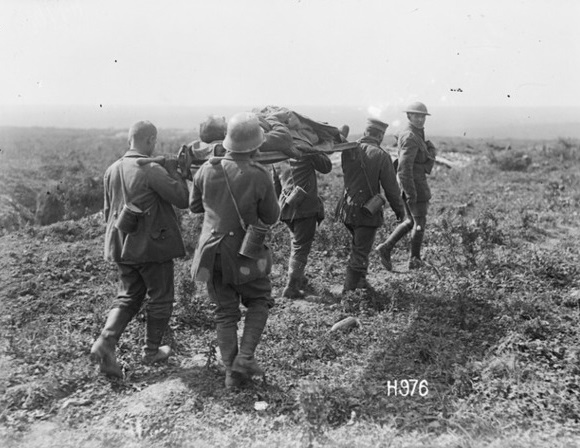
German prisoners carrying a wounded New Zealand soldier on a stretcher, Puisieux, 27 August 1918

The following day, 23 August, the 42nd Division attacked Dovecot; a battalion of Lancashire Fusiliers and the 10th Manchester Battalion, assisted by a battalion from the New Zealand Rifle Brigade, took the position after beginning their advance at 2:30 am. (Note: Lance Sergeant Edward Smith, of the Lancashire Fusiliers, earned the Victoria Cross (VC) for his actions over the period from 21–22 August, when he led his platoon in capturing several machine gun posts.) The New Zealanders also secured the flank of the 5th Division which attacked towards the village of Irles and then onto Loupart Wood and Grévillers. In the meantime, the 37th Division attacked and captured Bihucourt.

As a result of the operations of 21–23 August, the frontline had been established to the east of the Albert-Arras railway line with all but one of the ridges to the south and west of Bapaume held by IV Corps. However, the 5th Division had been unsuccessful in its attacks which left the ridge running from Loupart Wood to Grévillers and then onto Biefvillers still in the hands of the Germans. Although over 2,000 prisoners of war had been taken during this period along with 25 field guns, the 5th Division had suffered 1,600 casualties by this stage of the battle.

=== Advance onto Bapaume ===
The New Zealand Division was tasked to capture Grévillers, held by two battalions of the Royal Bavarian 14th Infantry Regiment (Kgl. Bayerisches 14. Infanterie-Regiment), and then push into, and beyond, Bapaume, while the 37th Division, on the left of the New Zealanders, was to capture Biefvillers. The attack had two phases; the 1st Infantry Brigade was to capture Loupart Wood and Grévillers and establish a line about 450 m (490 yd) beyond. This would leave Bapaume and the high ground beyond to be captured in the second phase by the 2nd Infantry Brigade. Intelligence indicated that Bapaume was lightly held and the advance was to be supported by two brigades of artillery as well as thirteen Mark IV tanks and a company of Whippets. Most of the armoured support was intended to cover the 2nd Infantry Brigade in its advance, as the artillery support was primarily for the 1st Infantry Brigade.

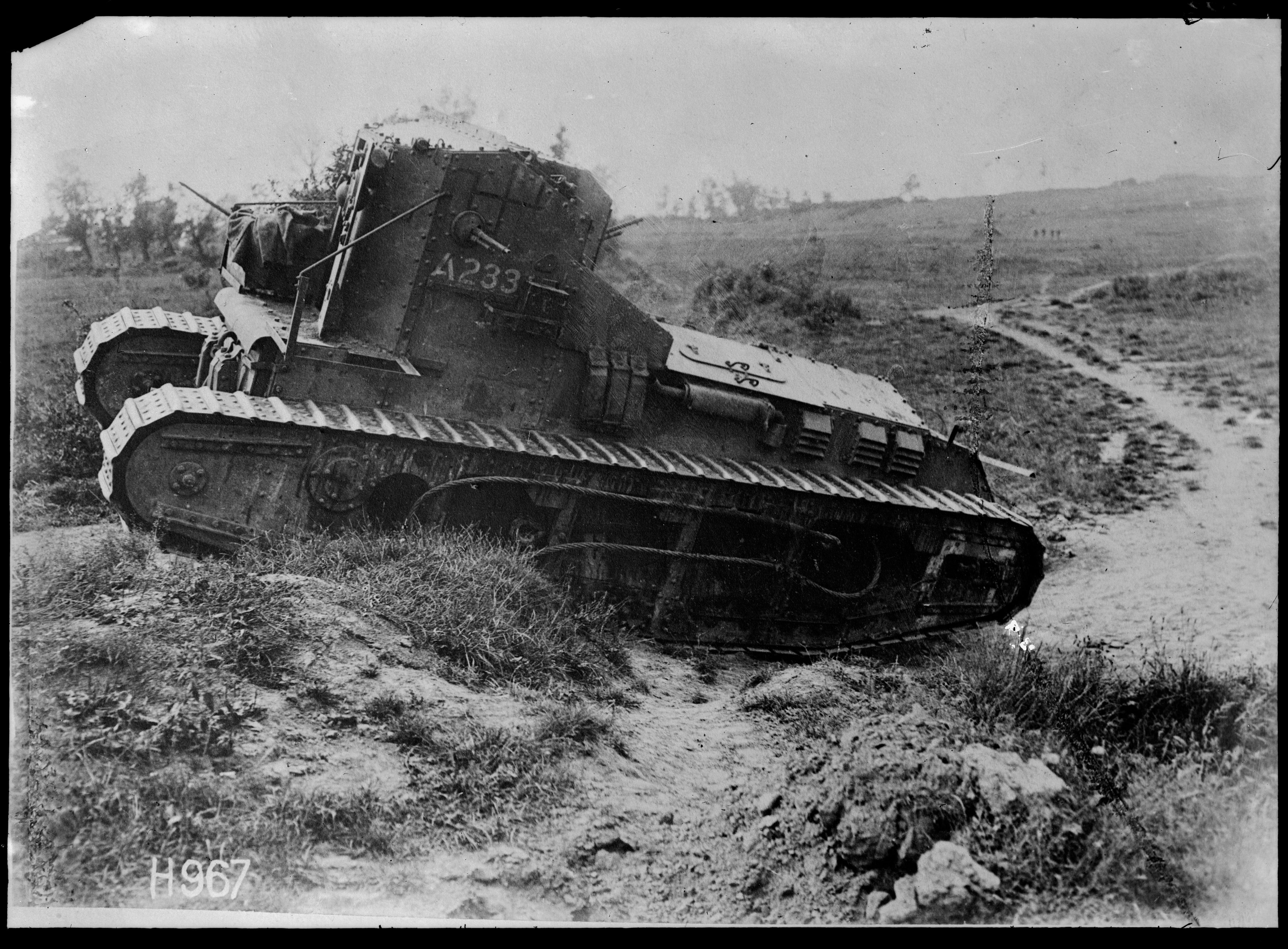
A Whippet tank crossing a trench near Grevillers, August 1918

The New Zealanders' attack began with a night-time advance on 24 August by the 1st Infantry Brigade to clear the approaches to Bapaume, including Loupart Wood and Grévillers. Brigadier General Charles Melvill, commanding the brigade, was directed to move onto Bapaume if it were able to do so quickly. However, progress was delayed by heavy machine gun fire and artillery took its toll on the supporting tanks allocated to the brigade. Furthermore, in contrast to the previous three days, the weather was poor. Despite this, Grévillers fell to the brigade along with 380 prisoners and several field guns. There were over 100 casualties among the attacking New Zealanders, including the commander of 2nd Auckland Battalion. (Note: Sergeant Samuel Forsyth earned a posthumous VC when he led a party in the capture of a strongpoint that was delaying the advance past Grévillers.)

It was planned that the 2nd Infantry Brigade would move past 1st Infantry Brigade once Grévillers was captured but it was forced into action early, when its commander, Brigadier General Robert Young, seeing that the 37th Division was struggling to take its objective of Biefvillers, decided to use his brigade to assist. Accordingly, two battalions cleared the village by 10:00 am although casualties were incurred when they were fired upon by some Whippet tanks. The commander of one of the attacking battalions, along with its padre, intervened and directed the tanks onto Biefvillers. With the village captured, this secured the flank of 1st Infantry Brigade.

However, 2nd Infantry Brigade, now the leading formation in the IV Corps sector due to the slow advance of the neighbouring divisions, was exposed to German gunfire on three sides. German reinforcements were now arriving in the sector; the New Zealanders had captured several personnel from the 44th Reserve Division and a further eight divisions had also arrived. An counterattack by the Germans pushed the leading battalions back from Avesnes-lès-Bapaume, a hamlet to the northwest of Bapaume. Nonetheless, the New Zealand Division was well positioned to take Bapaume. The front line was now a line running east of Grévillers and Biefvillers, and was less than 1 km (0.62 mi) from the outskirts of Bapaume.

=== Capture of Bapaume ===
==== First attempt ====
The plan to take Bapaume involved the 1st Infantry Brigade, positioned at Grévillers, moving to the south of Bapaume with the 63rd Division moving forward to protect the right flank of the New Zealanders. Meanwhile, the 2nd Infantry Brigade would move to the north of the town. Its left flank would be protected by the 37th Division. Their aim was to envelop Bapaume and force the Germans to abandon the town and thus avoid costly street to street fighting.

The advance began at 5:00 am on 25 August under the cover of fog. Despite German artillery fire on the front lines, this caused relatively few casualties amongst the New Zealanders. In the south, the 1st Infantry Brigade's 1st Auckland and 2nd Wellington Battalions skirted the southern side of Bapaume, taking fire from machine-gun posts on the outskirts of the town. They got as far as the Albert Road but the 63rd Division's advance was slowed by strong defence at the village of Thilloy, to the southeast of Bapaume. By the end of the day, this left the two New Zealand battalions exposed on both flanks. The New Zealanders dug in and conducted fighting patrols for the rest of the day. From several German prisoners it was determined that the 220th Prussian and 7th Bavarian Divisions were defending Bapaume.

To the north, the 2nd Infantry Brigade began their advance from Biefvillers over ground which favoured the defenders. The brigade had artillery support, in contrast to their fellow brigade to the south, as well as 23 tanks, although these were delayed. The 1st Battalion, Canterbury Regiment, one of the two leading battalions, made good progress and reached their objective for the day by 7:00 am, at the intersection of the Albert and Arras Roads. The other leading battalion was the 1st Otago, who struggled. The tanks supporting the Otago men caught up with the advancing infantry but misidentified them as Germans and opened fire. Once this instance of friendly fire was identified, the tanks then began engaging the Germans but were soon knocked out. By then, the tanks had provided the 1st Otago Battalion the opportunity to reach their objective for the day, the Arras Road. They managed to link up with the 37th Division on their left although not with the 1st Canterbury Battalion on their right. To fill the gap, Brigadier General Young ordered up the 2nd Canterbury Battalion and all three battalions consolidated their positions. The German 111th Division attempted to mount a counterattack later in the day but the massing troops were spotted and attacked by British reconnaissance aircraft. The Germans were caught by an artillery barrage covering a hastily arranged advance, to begin at 6:30 pm, by the New Zealanders and the 37th Division. This easier advance cleared Monument Wood and the southern reaches of the village of Favreuil by the conclusion of the day. Among the 2nd Infantry Brigade there were nearly 500 killed, wounded or missing for the day such that the 2nd would play no further role in the battle. Although the planned envelopment of Bapaume had not happened, the day's action resulted in the capture of over 400 prisoners of war along with many machine guns and an artillery piece.

==== Second attempt ====
The New Zealanders continued their efforts to encircle Bapaume on 26 August, their flanks protected by the neighbouring 63rd and 5th Divisions. The New Zealand Rifle Brigade took over the attack in the north from the 2nd Infantry Brigade, while 1st Infantry Brigade was to carry on with its advance in to the south. Should the two brigades successfully link up to the east of Bapaume, they would attack into the town from there. However, little progress was made in the south. The 63rd Division was still struggling to capture Thilloy while the advance of the 2nd Wellington Battalion, the leading unit of the 1st Infantry Brigade, was checked by gunfire from Bapaume on its right and from its left. The Wellington men had to eventually withdraw to their starting positions. (Note: As a result of this engagement, a VC was later awarded to Sergeant Reginald Judson, who led a bombing party that captured a machine gun post and then went on a solo foray, putting paid to a further two machine guns.)

To the north, the New Zealand Rifle Brigade suffered the attention of German artillery even before beginning to move forward at 1:00 am. The attack did not begin until 6:30 am, when three battalions of riflemen began advancing. There had been no time to arrange a covering barrage and there was no armoured support. Despite heavy machine gun fire, all three battalions made their initial objectives but made little progress beyond these due to the strongly defended villages of St. Aubin and Beugnâtre, both to the northeast of Bapaume. Beugnâtre had been thought to have been captured by the 5th Division and thus the German presence in the village was unexpected. By 10:00 am, the attack had petered out and the battalions were consolidating their positions, during which they had to fend off a counterattack from Beugnâtre. On short notice, a further attack was arranged for the evening with the aim of pushing forward to the road to Cambrai, this time with a supporting artillery barrage. The 3rd Rifle Battalion of the New Zealand Rifle Brigade, in a salient between Bapaume and St. Aubin, was to test the defences of the town with fighting patrols. The 2nd Rifle Battalion was to flank St. Aubin and advance for the Cambrai Road alongside 4th Rifle Battalion, which would also link up with 5th Division, which had the task of taking Beugnâtre. However, instructions to the attacking battalions were issued late and several companies did not receive their orders until the barrage had already commenced. Brigadier General Herbert Hart, commanding the New Zealand Rifle Brigade, realising the inadequacy of the preparation time, tried to cancel the operation but to no avail. Despite this, Beugnâtre did fall to the British; advancing under a covering barrage, the King's Own Scottish Borderers (KOSB) penetrated the village relatively easily before encountering strong machine-gun fire. Even so, the KOSB pushed the Germans out and this secured the outer flank of the New Zealand Rifle Brigade. However, while the New Zealanders did reach the Cambrai road, they were unable to hold it and had to settle for securing the railway line to Cambrai instead, this line being a little to the west of the road. St. Aubin was also captured by the 2nd Rifle Battalion.

==== Third attempt ====
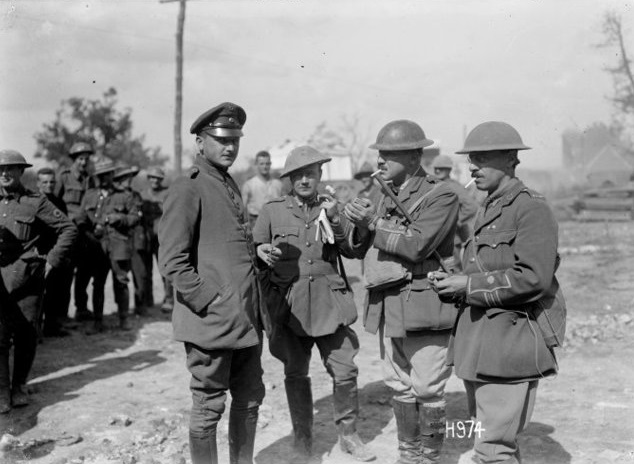
A German medical officer, detailed to attend the German wounded and who came to a New Zealand ambulance near the front line at Bapaume, with two New Zealand officers, 27 August 1918

The efforts of 26 August had seen the front line advanced by some 910 m (1,000 yd) along a frontage of 2,300 m (2,500 yd). Bapaume was now encircled entirely from the north but less so from the south. Overnight, the German forces were ordered to retreat to positions 24 km (15 mi) to 32 km (20 mi) west of the Hindenburg Line. In the meantime, the complete envelopment of Bapaume was to be continued. On 27 August, 63rd Division continued its efforts to capture Thilloy which continued to inhibit the move forwards in the south. The New Zealanders were to avoid a direct assault on Bapaume; it was hoped that the German defenders would surrender once they had been fully encircled. The Rifle Brigade however continued to engage in fighting patrols, testing the German defences. Both Bapaume and Thilloy were heavily bombarded during the day but despite this Thilloy continued to hold out. The next day, the 42nd Division moved in to relieve the 63rd Division.

Beginning to appreciate the fact that Bapaume may have to be directly attacked, Russell, encouraged by Harper, the commander of IV Corps, began drawing up plans to do so on 29 August, using the 1st Wellington Battalion, of 1st Infantry Brigade. However, it was still hoped that the Germans would withdraw on their own initiative. The bombardment on Bapaume continued into 28 August while 1st Infantry Brigade moved in close to the town on its southern frontage. Particularly heavy barrages were made during the evening and it was noted that the German response was relatively muted and by early in the morning of 29 August, there was no gun fire coming from Bapaume. Overnight, Bapaume had been abandoned, a state of affairs confirmed by patrols of the 3rd Rifle Battalion entering the town from the north. They observed retreating Germans making for Bancourt, to the east. Meanwhile, 2nd Auckland Battalion entered Bapaume from the south. Likewise, the Germans had retreated from Thilloy and the 5th Manchester Battalion, of 42nd Division, moved through the village and secured it.

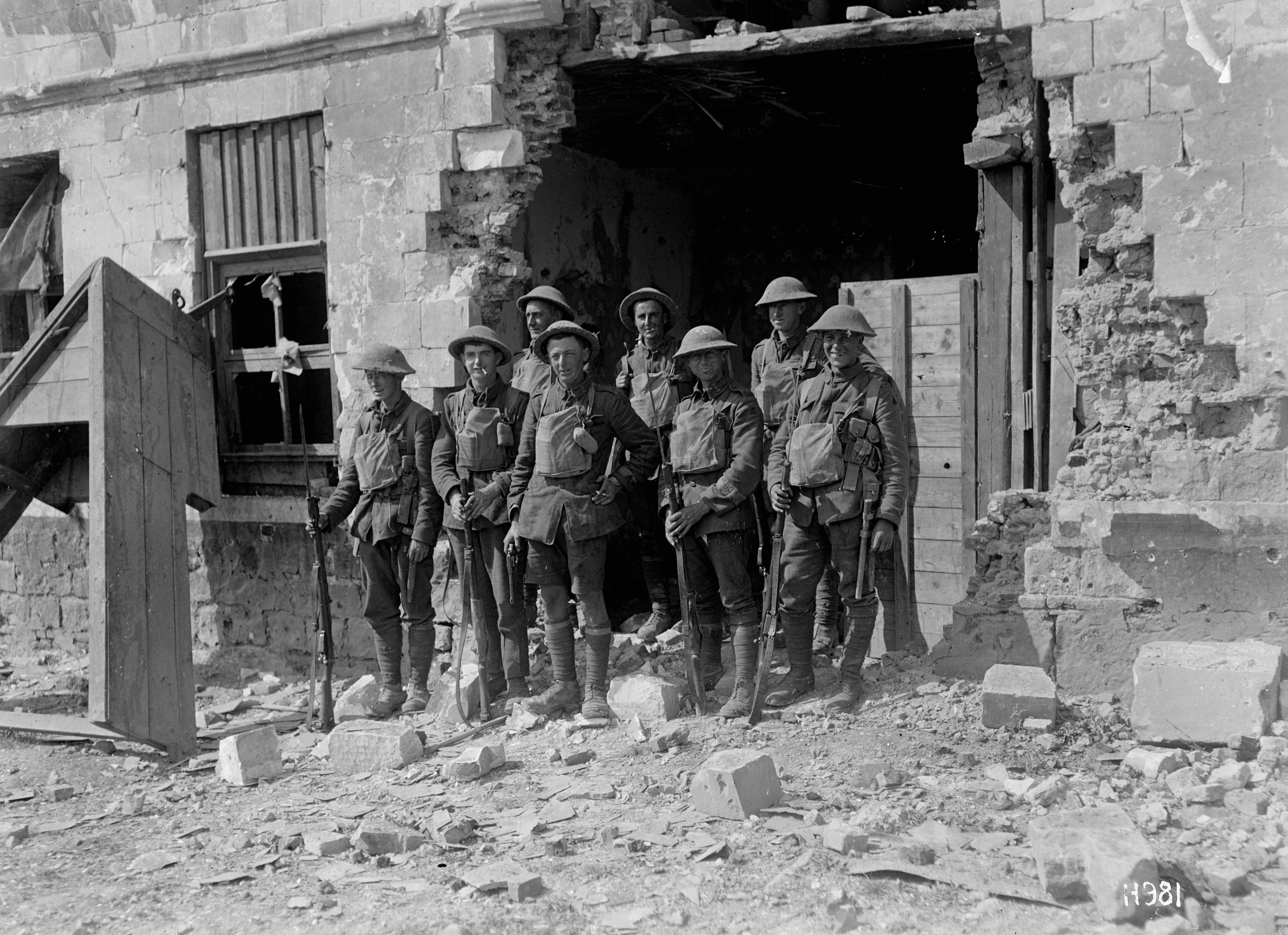
A section of New Zealand riflemen in newly captured Bapaume

After the protracted fighting of the previous few days, Bapaume was now in the hands of the New Zealanders. Before the town was abandoned by the Germans, numerous booby traps had been set which had to be found and deactivated over the next days. In the meantime, the Rifle Brigade moved forward and established a new line 1,400 m (1,500 yd) east of Bapaume. A similar distance beyond this lay the villages of Frémicourt and Bancourt, to which the Germans had retreated.

=== Continuing the advance ===
The battle was not yet over for the New Zealand Division as it was ordered to continue to chase the Germans and secure the Bancourt Ridge, in front of which the villages of Bancourt and Frémicourt lay. The advance was renewed on 30 August, with two battalions of the 1st Infantry Brigade tasked with capturing Bancourt while the New Zealand Rifle Brigade was to take Frémicourt. They were then to push onto Bancourt Ridge.

The 1st Rifle Battalion, with the assistance of a howitzer barrage on Frémicourt, cleared the village with 90 minutes of its 5:00 am start time. The leading companies then pushed onto the Bancourt Ridge. However, they had to withdraw as the 1st Infantry Brigade had not reached its sector of the ridge. In the course of their action, 400 prisoners had been taken and the front line advanced by 2,000 m (2,200 yd). In the 1st Infantry Brigade's sector, a German artillery barrage caused some casualties among the assembling troops of the 1st Wellington Battalion. Likewise, 2nd Auckland Battalion, was also caught in the open. It had postponed its advance, scheduled for 5:00 am, because it was discovered that the neighbouring 42nd Division had not moved up sufficiently to cover its flanks. Despite this, the Wellington men secured their objective of the Bancourt Ridge, linking up with companies of the Rifle Brigade that were already there. When the Aucklanders did move off, at 6:00 am, they had lost the benefit of their own covering barrage and their efforts to take Bancourt village was slowed by machine gun fire. It was eventually seized by 8:00 am and the battalion pushed onto the ridge beyond. However, as the flanking 42nd Division had failed to take the village of Riencourt, its flanks were exposed and they, along with the New Zealand Rifle Brigade, had to retreat to the foot of the ridge. It was not until the early hours of 31 August that Riencourt fell to 42nd Division, after its 10th Manchester Battalion made a nighttime attack. At one point, a German field gun was captured and turned against them by a crew of gunners from the division's artillery brigade.

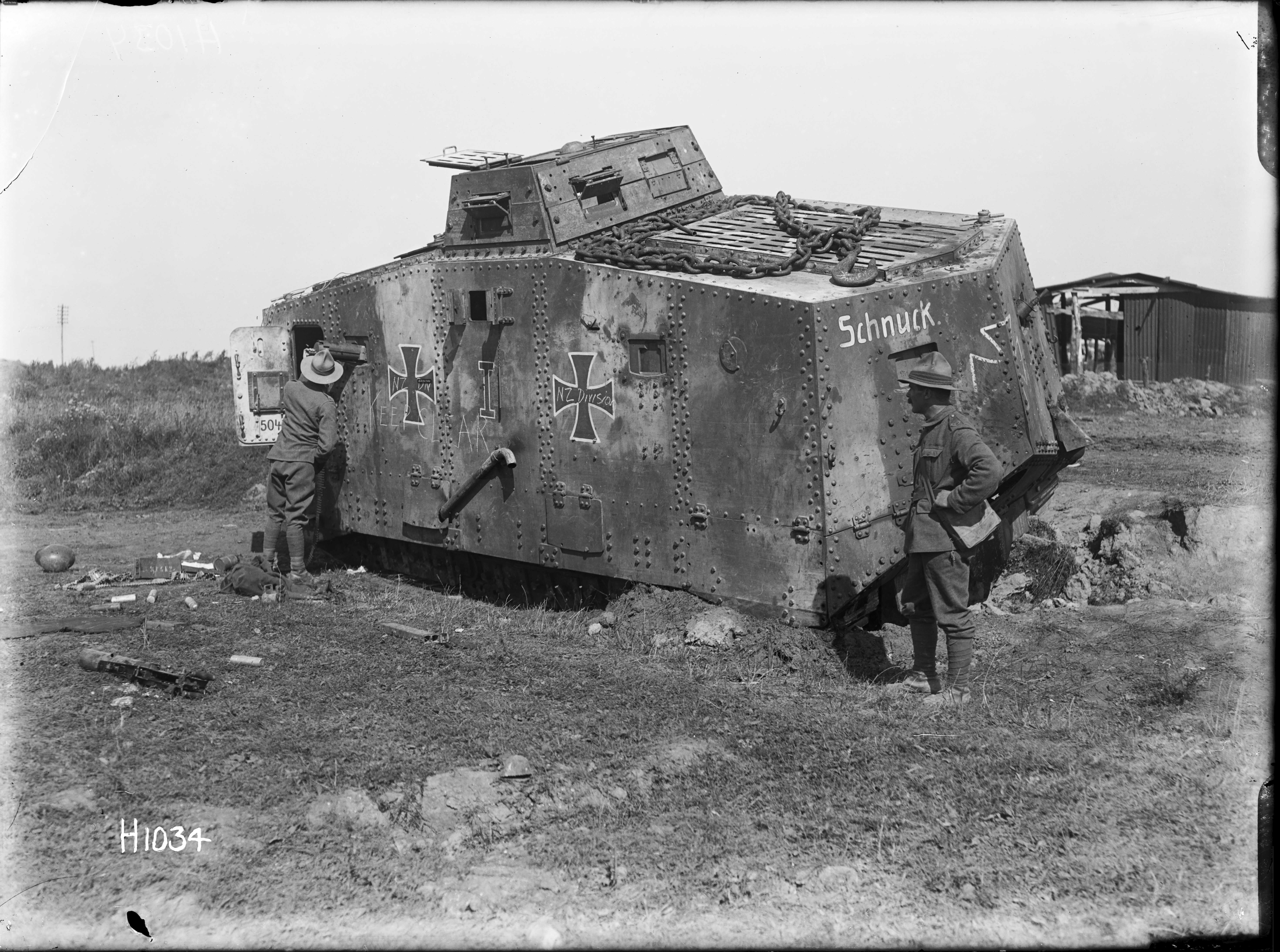
New Zealand soldiers examining the German A7V tank Schnuck captured at Frémicourt on 31 August 1918

At daybreak the same day, the Germans counterattacked the New Zealand positions with elements of three divisions; the 23rd Saxon Division, 16th and 4th Bavarian Infantry Divisions. The counterattack was supported by four A7V tanks which attempted to make for Frémicourt but then returned to their own lines. Mistaken for British armour, they were fired on by their own infantry. Two of these tanks were captured by the New Zealanders as they tried to evade the attentions of their countrymen. Although the German attack, later described as having "insufficiently preparation", did cause the New Zealanders to cede ground, they regained it later in the day.

On 1 September, IV Corps began operations designed to capture Bancourt Ridge and allow the advance to continue. Under the cover of an artillery barrage, the 42nd Division, New Zealand Division, and 5th Division, from right to left respectively, would begin advancing at 4:55 am. As had frequently happened during the battle, the New Zealanders found themselves ahead of the flanking divisions. The New Zealand Rifle Brigade swiftly made the crest of the ridge, taking 70 prisoners. The 1st Infantry Brigade was a little slower; the 1st Wellington Battalion made the crest and consolidated itself there. (Note: One of the battalion's sergeants, John Gildroy Grant, was awarded the VC for his actions in rushing three machine gun posts that were holding up the advance of his company.) The other battalion, 2nd Auckland, despite the assistance of two tanks, was unable to do the same. Operating on the extreme flank of the New Zealand Division's sector of the front, it suffered the most from the lack of progress of the 42nd Division and was unable hold its portion of the crest. That evening, the 2nd Infantry Brigade moved into the line, replacing both the New Zealand Rifle Brigade and 1st Infantry Brigade.

== Aftermath ==
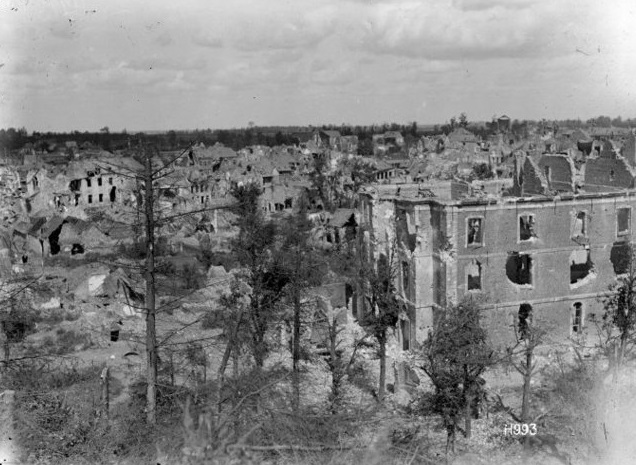
A view over Bapaume, taken by Henry Armytage Sanders the day after its capture, showing the huge amount of destruction to the town

The 2nd Infantry Brigade took over the vanguard of the advance on 2 September, tasked with clearing the Germans from their positions overlooking Haplincourt. This they did after overcoming numerous machine gun nests, plus the guns of two disabled tanks being used as outposts. Over 350 prisoners of war were taken, along with 80 machine guns plus a field gun. Their advance was not as quick as that of the 42nd Division, making a corresponding move forward, which had made good progress and the British, until the New Zealanders caught up, had to lay down heavy suppressing fire on both flanks. The New Zealand Division now halted for a few days as pressure was being placed on the German lines elsewhere and the emphasis for IV Corps was now to pursue the enemy to the Hindenburg Line.

On 9 September, the New Zealand Division resumed its move forward, moving onto the outer defences of the Hindenburg Line, including Trescault Spur, which overlooked the German positions. Later that month, in conjunction with 37th Division and elements of the 38th Division, the New Zealanders attacked and captured the spur on 12 September. After this engagement, the New Zealand Division was withdrawn to Bapaume for a two-week rest and refit.

During the period of its involvement in the Second Battle of Bapaume, there were over 11,000 casualties in IV Corps for an advance of over 32 km (20 mi) during which it took nearly 8,000 prisoners of war. In the New Zealand Division, over 800 personnel had been killed in action and over 2,300 wounded. It was one of the most costly engagements of the war for the New Zealanders. Among the British divisions involved, the 5th suffered over 4,200 casualties, while the 42nd incurred over 1,500.
