= Harry Laurent =

Recipient of the Victoria Cross

Harry Laurent VC
- Harry Laurent during the First World War
- Born: 15 April 1895; Tarata, New Zealand
- Died: 9 December 1987 (aged 92); Hastings, New Zealand
- Burial place: Servicemen's Cemetery, Hāwera
- Military career
- Allegiance: New Zealand
- Branch: New Zealand Military Forces
- Service years: 1911–1919; 1939–1949
- Rank: Lieutenant Colonel
- Units: 2nd Battalion, New Zealand Rifle Brigade (1915–18)
- Conflicts: First World War; Western Front; Battle of Flers–Courcelette; Battle of Messines; First Battle of Passchendaele; Second World War; Home Front
- Awards: Victoria Cross

Harry John Laurent, VC (15 April 1895 – 9 December 1987) was a New Zealand recipient of the Victoria Cross (VC), the highest award for gallantry in the face of the enemy that can be awarded to British and Commonwealth forces.

Born in Tarata, Laurent was a grocer's assistant when he volunteered in May 1915 to serve in the First World War with the New Zealand Expeditionary Force (NZEF). He was posted to the 2nd Battalion of the New Zealand Rifle Brigade and from 1916 served on the Western Front. It was on 12 September 1918, during an engagement that followed the Second Battle of Bapaume, that he performed the actions that led to him being honoured with the VC. He ended the war as a second lieutenant. Discharged from the NZEF, he returned to civilian life but was recalled to active duty during the Second World War and was involved in the Home Guard. He was the last surviving New Zealand VC recipient of the First World War at the time of his death in 1987.

== Early life ==
Henry John Laurent, known as Harry, was born on 15 April 1895 in Tarata, in the Taranaki region of New Zealand. His father, John, and mother, Mary, were farmers. His family was of French descent, his grandfather, a former officer in the French Army, having emigrated to New Zealand in 1852. The family moved to Hāwera while Laurent was still a child. He attended Hawera District High School and after completing his education, he found work as a grocer's assistant. He also served with the Territorial Force, having joined at the age of 16.

== First World War ==
In May 1915, Laurent enlisted with the New Zealand Expeditionary Force (NZEF), shortly after his 20th birthday. An attempt to volunteer for the NZEF the previous year had been declined, as he was below the minimum age for service aboard. Posted to the 2nd Battalion of the New Zealand Rifle Brigade (NZRB), Laurent embarked for the Middle East in October 1915. He did not arrive in time to be involved in the Gallipoli Campaign and instead participated in the defence of the Suez Canal.

=== Western Front ===
In March 1916, the Rifle Brigade was designated part of the newly formed New Zealand Division and the following month it was sent to the Western Front. Laurent participated in the Battle of Flers–Courcelette, part of the Somme Offensive, during which he was wounded. After a period of hospital treatment, he returned to his battalion in April 1917. He received a series of promotions over the next several months, and during this time, his battalion participated in the Battle of Messines as the reserve for the NZRB, the First Battle of Passchendaele, and in defending the British lines near Colincamps during the German spring offensive of late-March 1918. By September 1918 Laurent had advanced in rank to sergeant.

During the Hundred Days Offensive, the New Zealand Division, following the Second Battle of Bapaume, was in pursuit of retreating German forces. Leading a patrol on 12 September in the area east of Gouzeaucourt Wood, France, Laurent was ordered to locate and regain contact with the German front lines. The 12-man patrol inadvertently penetrated through the front line and located a line of artillery. Realising the patrol's mistake, Laurent organised a swift attack which resulted in the capture of 112 prisoners, with one member of the patrol being killed and three others wounded. He then extricated his patrol, together with the prisoners, back to the New Zealand line, fighting off counterattacks along the way. For his bravery and leadership, he was awarded the Victoria Cross (VC). The VC, instituted in 1856, was the highest gallantry award that could be bestowed on a soldier of the British Empire. His VC was gazetted on 12 November 1918, and the citation read:

For most conspicuous bravery, skill, and enterprise when during an attack he was detailed to exploit an initial success and keep in touch with the enemy. With a party of twelve he located the enemy support line very strongly held, at once charged the position, followed by his men, and completely disorganised the enemy by his sudden onslaught. In the subsequent hand-to-hand fighting which ensued he showed great resourcefulness in controlling and encouraging his men, and thirty of the enemy having been killed, the remainder surrendered, a total of one officer and 111 other ranks in all. The success of this daring venture, which caused his party four casualties only, was due to his gallantry and enterprise

— The London Gazette, No. 31012, 19 November 1918

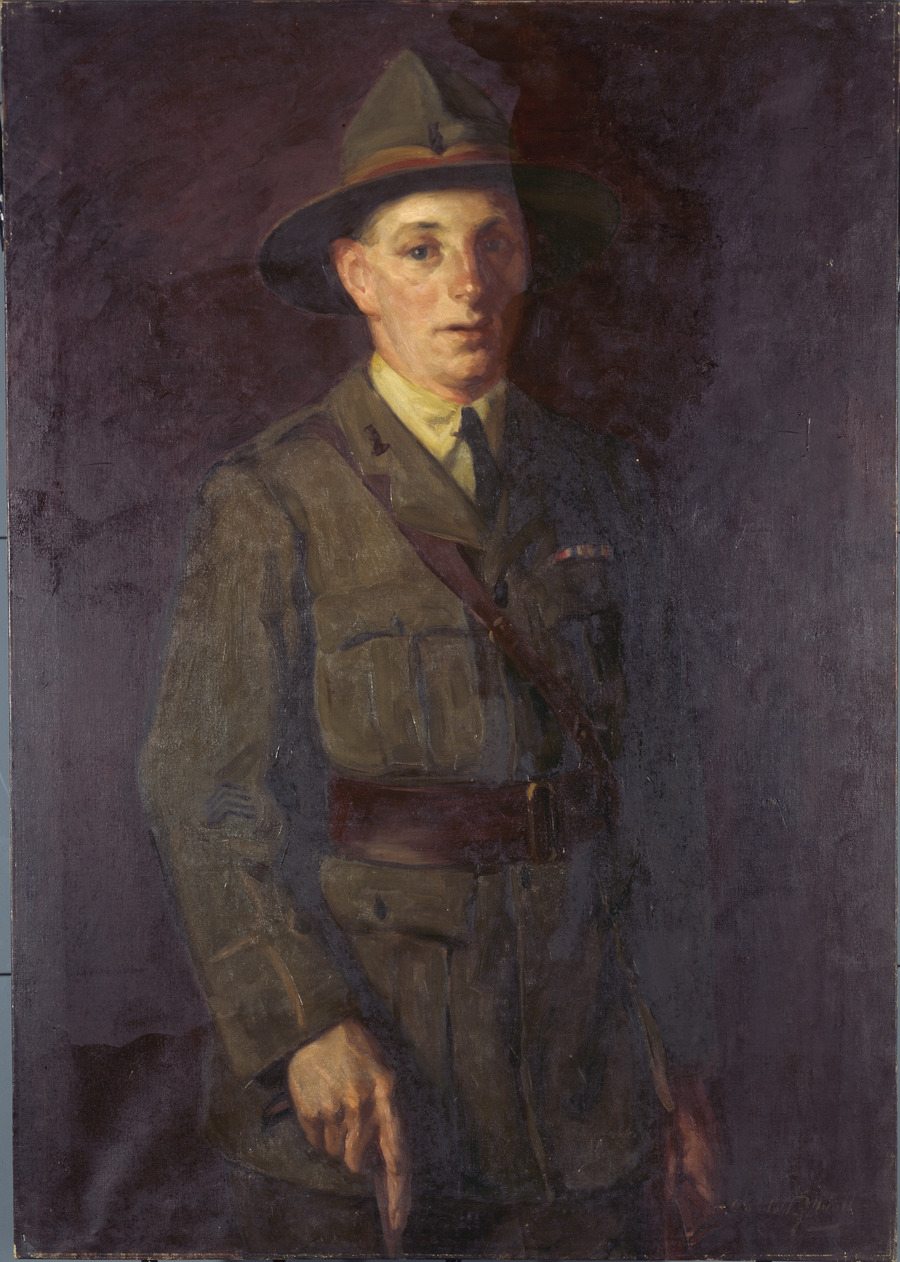
A portrait by Archibald Frank Nicoll of Laurent, painted in 1920

Laurent was sent to England in October 1918, where he attended an officer training school. The war had ended by the time he was commissioned in February 1919. He, together with three other New Zealanders who had been awarded the VC, (Note: The other New Zealand recipients were James Crichton, a private at the time, and Second Lieutenants Reginald Judson and John Grant.) received his medal from King George V in a ceremony at Buckingham Palace on 27 February 1919. A few months later, he left England for New Zealand and his hometown of Hāwera. On his arrival, the mayor presented him a gold watch and chain, the cost of which was met by public donations. In October 1919, he was part of the welcoming party when fellow VC recipient and Hāwera resident John Grant returned home.

== Later life ==
Discharged from the NZEF and placed on the Reserve of Officers, Laurent settled into life in Hāwera and soon found employment at a grocery store. He later worked as a sales representative. He married Ethel Homewood, originally from England, on 20 July 1921, in a ceremony at Hāwera. Fellow VC recipients John Grant and Leslie Andrew were present, the former in the capacity of best man. In 1937, Laurent, along with several other VC recipients, was awarded the coronation medal to commemorate the ascension of King George VI to the British throne.

During the Second World War, Laurent was recalled to the Reserve of Officers of the New Zealand Military Forces. He was soon commanding a battalion in the Home Guard. Later promoted to a temporary lieutenant colonel, he was made group director of the Hāwera Home Guard in early 1942. Late the following year he was appointed commander of the Hāwera squadron of the Air Training Corps and held this post until 1945. He was formally seconded to the Royal New Zealand Air Force for a brief period as a squadron commander of 34th Air Training Squadron before ceasing active duty at the end of the war. He formally retired from the military in 1949.

In 1953, Laurent was awarded the Queen Elizabeth II Coronation Medal. At the age of 61, he went to London in 1956 as part of the VC centenary celebrations. He attended further VC events in the following years. In 1977, he received the Queen Elizabeth II Silver Jubilee Medal. He died in Hastings on 9 December 1987, the last surviving New Zealand VC recipient of the First World War. His wife had predeceased him the previous year. His ashes are interred in the Memorial Wall at the Servicemen's Cemetery at Hāwera, his hometown. A street in the town is also named after him, and nearby is Grant VC Street, named for fellow VC recipient John Grant.

Laurent's VC was displayed at the QEII Army Memorial Museum in Waiouru, along with his service medals from the First and Second World Wars and his coronation medals. On 2 December 2007, Laurent's VC was one of nine Victoria Crosses that were among a hundred medals stolen from the museum. On 16 February 2008, New Zealand Police announced all the medals had been recovered as a result of a NZ$300,000 reward offered by Michael Ashcroft and Tom Sturgess.

== Notes ==
Footnotes

Citations
