= John Gildroy Grant =

Recipient of the Victoria Cross

John Gildroy Grant VC
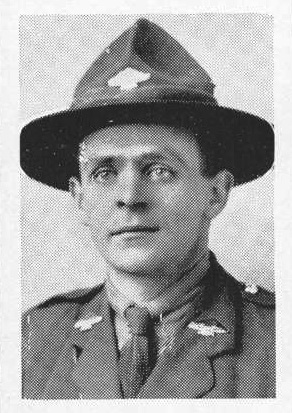
- Born: 26 August 1889; Hāwera, New Zealand
- Died: 25 November 1970 (aged 81)
- Military career
- Allegiance: New Zealand
- Branch: New Zealand Military Forces
- Service years: 1915–1929
- Rank: Lieutenant
- Unit: Wellington Regiment
- Conflicts: First World War; Battle of Flers–Courcelette; Battle of Messines; Battle of Broodseinde; Second Battle of Bapaume
- Awards: Victoria Cross

John Gildroy Grant, VC (26 August 1889 – 25 November 1970) was a soldier in the New Zealand Military Forces during the First World War. He was a recipient of the Victoria Cross, the highest award for gallantry "in the face of the enemy" that could be awarded at the time to British and Commonwealth forces.

Born in Hāwera, Grant was a builder when he volunteered in June 1915 to serve in the First World War with the New Zealand Expeditionary Force (NZEF). He was posted to the 1st Battalion of the Wellington Regiment which began its service on the Western Front in 1916. It was on 1 September 1918, during an engagement at Bancourt, France, that he attacked two machine-gun posts, which led to him being awarded with the VC. He ended the war as a second lieutenant. Discharged from the NZEF, he returned to civilian life and then joined the Territorial Force. In his later years, he struggled to hold down regular employment due to the effects of what was most likely post-traumatic stress disorder. He died in 1970 at the age of 81.

== Early life ==
John Grant was born on 26 August 1889 in Hāwera, a small town in the Taranaki region of New Zealand. He was one of the nine children of George and Jane Grant, who were both originally from Scotland. He attended Hāwera Main School and when his education was completed, he took up construction work. A volunteer fireman, he was working as a builder when he enlisted in the New Zealand Expeditionary Force (NZEF) in June 1915.

== First World War ==
At the time of Grant's enlistment, the main contingent of the NZEF, which had formed the New Zealand and Australian Division, was engaged in the Gallipoli Campaign. After initial training, he embarked for the Middle East in October 1915 with the 7th Reinforcements. He joined the 1st Battalion, Wellington Regiment of the New Zealand Division, then being formed in Egypt in the aftermath of the evacuation from the Gallipoli Peninsula. It embarked for the Western Front in March 1916. Grant served on active duty throughout 1916 and into 1917, during which time his battalion fought in a number of battles, including the Battle of Flers–Courcelette, where about a quarter of its strength became casualties. It also fought in the Battle of Messines, where it was involved in the encirclement of Messines village and captured 200 German soldiers. During its time in the battle, it suffered over 400 killed and wounded. In June 1917, he was promoted to corporal. A few months later, his battalion was one of the leading units in the Battle of Broodseinde. It missed the First Battle of Passchendaele that followed a few days afterward and avoided the heavy casualties that befell the units involved. In early 1918 he was made a sergeant.

From late August to early September 1918, the New Zealand Division was engaged in the Second Battle of Bapaume, which had as its objective the town of Bapaume. On 1 September, near Bancourt, the lead elements of the 1st Battalion came under heavy fire from a series of German machine-gun posts, which threatened their advance. Despite this, Grant's platoon pressed on. As they neared one of the posts, Grant, followed by another soldier, Lance Corporal Cecil Hill, broke ahead and entered the post, "demoralising" the crew, according to the London Gazette, and allowing his platoon to capture the Germans. Grant attacked another nearby machine-gun post in similar fashion and soon his platoon, and the rest of his company, were able to put the remaining posts out of action. His battalion was relieved that evening. While Hill was awarded the Distinguished Conduct Medal for his part in the operation of 1 September, Grant was awarded the Victoria Cross (VC). The VC, instituted in 1856, was the highest gallantry award that could be bestowed on a soldier of the British Empire. The citation read:

For most conspicuous bravery and devotion to duty near Bancourt on the 1st September, 1918, when Serjeant in command of a platoon forming part of the leading waves of the battalion attacking the high ground to the east of Bancourt. On reaching the crest, it was found that a line of five enemy machine-gun posts offered a serious obstacle to further advance. Under point blank fire, however, the company advanced against these posts. When about twenty yards from the posts Sjt. Grant, closely followed by a comrade, rushed forward ahead of his platoon, and with great dash and bravery entered the centre post, demoralising the garrison and enabling the men of his platoon to mop up the position. In the same manner he then rushed the post on the left and the remaining posts were quickly occupied and cleared by his company. Throughout the whole operation on this and the two previous days Sjt. Grant displayed coolness, determination, and valour of the highest order, and set a splendid example to all.

— London Gazette, No. 31034, 26 November 1918

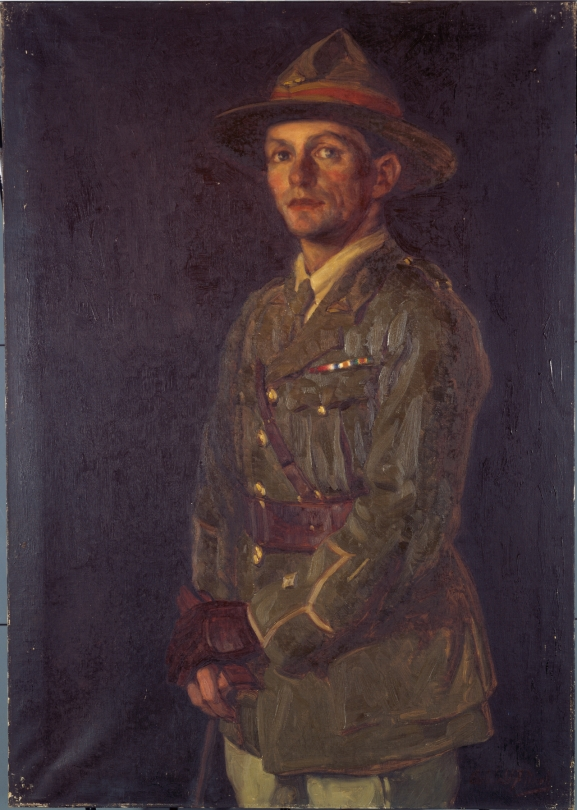
A portrait of Grant, painted by Archibald Frank Nicoll in 1920

Shortly afterwards, Grant was promoted to second lieutenant and travelled to Cambridge in England for officer training in October 1918. He was wounded in early November, within days of his return to the front. Together with three other New Zealanders who had been awarded the VC, (Note: These were James Crichton, a private at the time, and Reginald Judson and Harry Laurent, both second lieutenants.) he received his medal from King George V in a ceremony at Buckingham Palace on 27 February 1919. His service with the NZEF ended with his repatriation to New Zealand later that year. His home town of Hāwera gave him a formal welcome on his return on 29 October and he was presented with an inscribed gold watch.

== Later life ==
In April 1921, Grant successfully stood for election as a city councillor for Hawera. Later the same year, he was the best man at the wedding of Harry Laurent, another VC recipient who was also from Hawera. Grant soon married as well, and had two children.

Grant remained involved with military life, serving in the Territorial Force until 1929, by which time he had reached the rank of lieutenant. He was discharged due to his age and also for being unable to attend camp. The same year he went to London to attend a formal dinner for VC recipients. He later worked in Paeroa but found it difficult to gain and maintain employment. By this time, his marriage had broken down and he had been made bankrupt. In 1934, his plight attracted the attention of the authorities. On investigation it was determined it was his own erratic behaviour that was the cause of his difficulties. Undiagnosed at the time, it is thought that Grant could have suffered from post-traumatic stress disorder.

In 1937, Grant, along with several other VC recipients, was awarded the coronation medal to commemorate the ascension of King George VI to the British throne. In 1953, he was awarded the Queen Elizabeth II Coronation Medal. He attended the VC centenary event held in London in 1956 and also the VC reunion in 1968. Due to his health at the time, the latter event required public donations to pay for his flights and medical care.

In his final years, Grant became a freemason and lived at the Masonic Village in Mount Roskill in Auckland. He died on 25 November 1970 at the age of 81, and is buried in Auckland's Waikumete Cemetery. Streets in Hāwera are named for both Grant and Laurent, in recognition of their VCs. In September 2018, statues of Grant and Laurent were unveiled at Hāwera's Victoria Cross garden.

== Medals ==
Grant's VC, along with his 1914–15 Star, British War Medal, Victory Medal, and coronation medals, is alternately displayed at the QEII Army Memorial Museum in Waiouru and the Puke Ariki in New Plymouth. On 2 December 2007, it was one of nine VCs that were among a hundred medals stolen from the QEII Army Memorial Museum. On 16 February 2008, New Zealand Police announced all the medals had been recovered as a result of a NZ$300,000 reward offered by Michael Ashcroft and Tom Sturgess.
