= Thomas Cooke (soldier, born 1881) =

Recipient of the Victoria Cross

Thomas Cooke VC
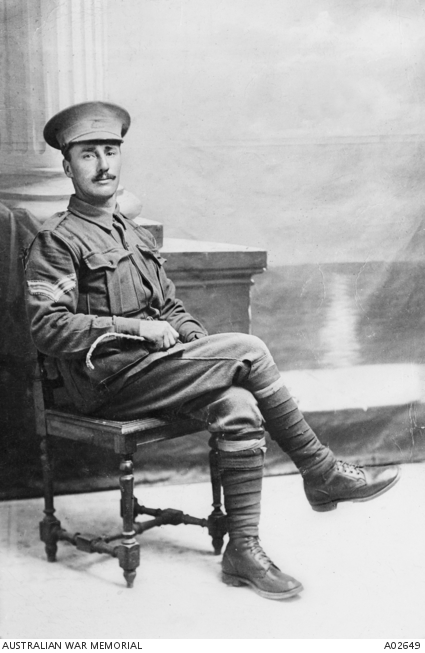
- Studio portrait of Thomas Cooke
- Born: 5 July 1881; Kaikōura, New Zealand
- Died: 25 July 1916 (aged 35) †; Pozières, France
- Military career
- Allegiance: Australia
- Branch: Australian Imperial Force
- Service years: 1915–1916
- Rank: Private
- Units: 8th Battalion
- Conflicts: First World War; Western Front; Battle of the Somme; Battle of Pozières †
- Awards: Victoria Cross

Thomas Cooke, VC (5 July 1881 – 25 July 1916) was a New Zealand-born soldier who served in the Australian Imperial Force during the First World War. He was a recipient of the Victoria Cross, the highest award for gallantry "in the face of the enemy" that can be awarded to personnel of British and Commonwealth forces.

Born in Kaikōura to English immigrants, Cooke became a carpenter after finishing school. He moved to Australia in 1912, taking his young family with him, and settled in Melbourne. He enlisted in the Australian Imperial Force in February 1915 and, after completing his training, embarked for the Middle East. On arrival, he was posted to the 8th Battalion. Soon his battalion was serving in the Somme sector on the Western Front. Killed during the Battle of Pozières, he was posthumously awarded the VC for his actions in staying at his post in the face of a German attack.

== Early life ==
Thomas Cooke was born in Kaikōura, New Zealand, on 5 July 1881, to Tom Cooke, an Englishman who was a carpenter, and his wife Caroline née Cooper. One of at least three children, he was educated at Kaikōura District High School. His father later moved the family to Wellington where Cooke became a carpenter. He also played the cornet and was part of a military band. In 1902, he married Maud Elizabeth Elliott and the couple had three children, two girls and a boy. In June 1912, he moved his young family to Australia and settled in the suburb of Richmond, in Melbourne, where he worked as a builder.

== First World War ==
In February 1915 Cooke enlisted in the Australian Imperial Force (AIF) for service abroad in the First World War. He was posted to the 24th Battalion as a reinforcement upon completion of his training at Broadmeadows. He was initially engaged in clerical work and was also assigned to the regimental band. He embarked for the Middle East aboard HMAT Commonwealth in November and at this time was promoted to acting corporal. His assignment to the 24th Battalion proved relatively short-lived for at the time of his arrival in Egypt in February 1916, the AIF was undergoing a significant expansion and reorganisation. He was transferred to the 8th Battalion and reverted to his original rank of private.

The 8th Battalion, as part of the 2nd Infantry Brigade, 1st Australian Division, initially served in the Suez Canal zone before leaving Egypt on 26 March 1916. It arrived on the Western Front in April 1916 and was initially stationed in the Fleurbaix and then the Messines sectors. As part of the 1st Division, it moved to the Somme sector in mid-July for its role in the upcoming Somme Offensive. On 23 July, the battalion entered the Battle of Pozières as reinforcements for the 1st Infantry Brigade. Late in the evening it had advanced into Pozières and was established on the northern edges of the village. On 25 July the Australians were seeking to push their positions further north of Pozières. Cooke's battalion advanced and made further ground but halted under a heavy bombardment. A German advance that threatened the Australian positions was observed. Cooke, operating a Lewis machine-gun, was sent forward with his team to stabilise an unsafe section of the line. He and his companions secured the area but were exposed to long range machine-gun fire which soon accounted for all but Cooke. Even after running out of ammunition, he continued to man his post in the face of a German counterattack. By the time reinforcements arrived at his position, he had been killed. A full strength Australian infantry battalion typically had around 1,000 personnel; when the 8th Battalion was withdrawn from the front lines two days later, it had incurred over 330 casualties.

Cooke was recommended for the Victoria Cross (VC) for his actions of 25 July. At the time, the VC, instituted in 1856, was the highest gallantry award that could be bestowed on a soldier of the British Empire. The award of the VC to Cooke was gazetted on 9 September 1916 and the citation read as follows:

For most conspicuous bravery. After a Lewis gun had been disabled, he was ordered to take his gun and gun-team to a dangerous part of the line. Here he did fine work, but came under very heavy fire, with the result that finally he was the only man left. He still stuck to his post, and continued to fire his gun. When assistance was sent he was found dead beside his gun. He set a splendid example of determination and devotion to duty.

— London Gazette, 9 September 1916

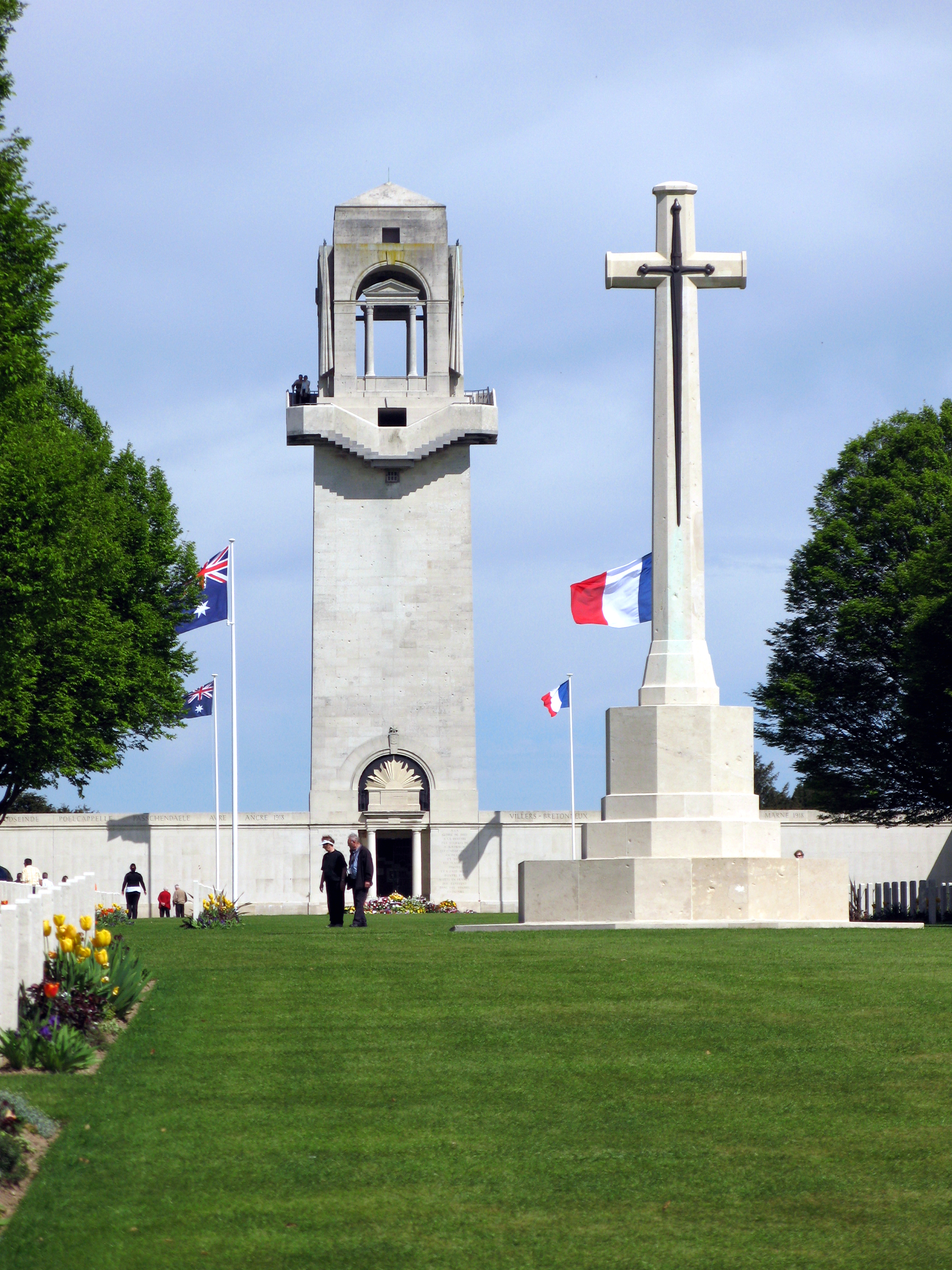
The Australian National Memorial at Villers-Bretonneux, on which Cooke's name is recorded

Cooke's wife was unaware of the award of the VC to her husband until reading of it in newspaper reports. The medal was eventually presented to her by Arthur Foljambe, the Governor-General of New Zealand, in a ceremony at Government House in Wellington on 31 January 1917. His wife, who had returned to Wellington at the time of Cooke's enlistment in the AIF, later remarried. Cooke has no known grave site, but his name is recorded on the Villers-Bretonneux Memorial and also on the war memorial in Kaikōura, his town of birth.

== Medals and legacy ==
As well as the VC, Cooke was entitled to the British War Medal and Victory Medal, both being campaign medals. These are displayed at the National Army Museum at Waiouru in New Zealand. A street in Canberra, Australia, is named for him and he is named on VC memorials in Canberra and Sydney. In 2010, a newly built barracks building at the Linton Military Camp was named for Cooke; several of his descendants were present at the opening ceremony.
