= James Crichton (soldier) =

Recipient of the Victoria Cross

James Crichton VC
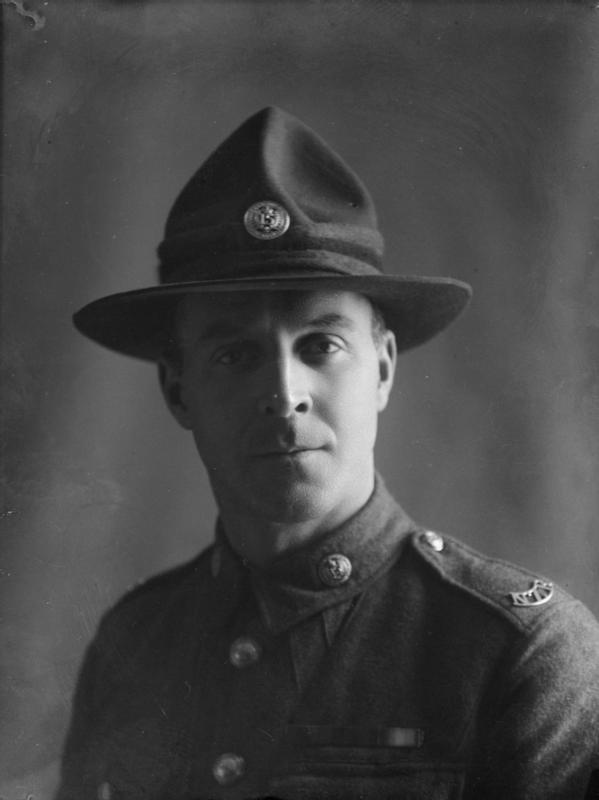
- Private James Crichton c.1918–19
- Born: 15 July 1879; Carrickfergus, County Antrim, Ireland
- Died: 22 September 1961 (aged 82); Auckland City Hospital, Auckland, New Zealand
- Military career
- Allegiance: United Kingdom; New Zealand
- Branch: British Army; New Zealand Military Forces
- Service years: 1897–1904; 1914–1919
- Rank: Sergeant
- Nickname: "Scotty"
- Units: 2nd Battalion, Auckland Infantry Regiment
- Conflicts: Second Boer War; First World War; Gallipoli Campaign; Western Front; Hundred Days Offensive
- Awards: Victoria Cross

James Crichton, VC (15 July 1879 – 22 September 1961) was an Irish-born soldier and a recipient of the Victoria Cross (VC), the highest award for gallantry in the face of the enemy that could be awarded at that time to British and Commonwealth forces.

Born in 1879 in Ireland, Crichton served with the British Army during the Second Boer War, and later emigrated to New Zealand. Following the outbreak of the First World War, he joined the New Zealand Military Forces and served with the Army Service Corps during the Gallipoli Campaign and on the Western Front in a field bakery. He transferred to the infantry in May 1918. On 30 September 1918, during the Hundred Days Offensive, as well as carrying messages while under gunfire, he deactivated demolition charges set by German forces to destroy a bridge. For these actions, he was awarded the VC. He went to London in 1937 for the coronation of King George VI and Queen Elizabeth and again nearly 20 years later for the VC centenary. He died in 1961, aged 82.

== Early life ==
Crichton was born in Carrickfergus, in Ireland, on 15 July 1879. His family moved to the mining hamlet of Northrigg by Blackridge in what is now West Lothian, Scotland, when he was young. By the age of 10, he was working in a coal mine. Nicknamed "Scotty", he joined the British Army by enlisting in the Royal Scots Regiment at the age of 18. Two years later, he transferred to the Cameron Highlanders. He remained with the Highlanders for five years, including a period in South Africa during the Second Boer War.

During the Boer War, Crichton served with the Highlander's 1st Battalion, which saw action at the capture of Pretoria, the Battle of Diamond Hill, and the Battle of Nooitgedacht. In 1904, he returned to civilian life. He later moved to New Zealand and settled in Auckland. He took up employment as a cable splicer with the New Zealand Post & Telegraph Department.

== First World War ==
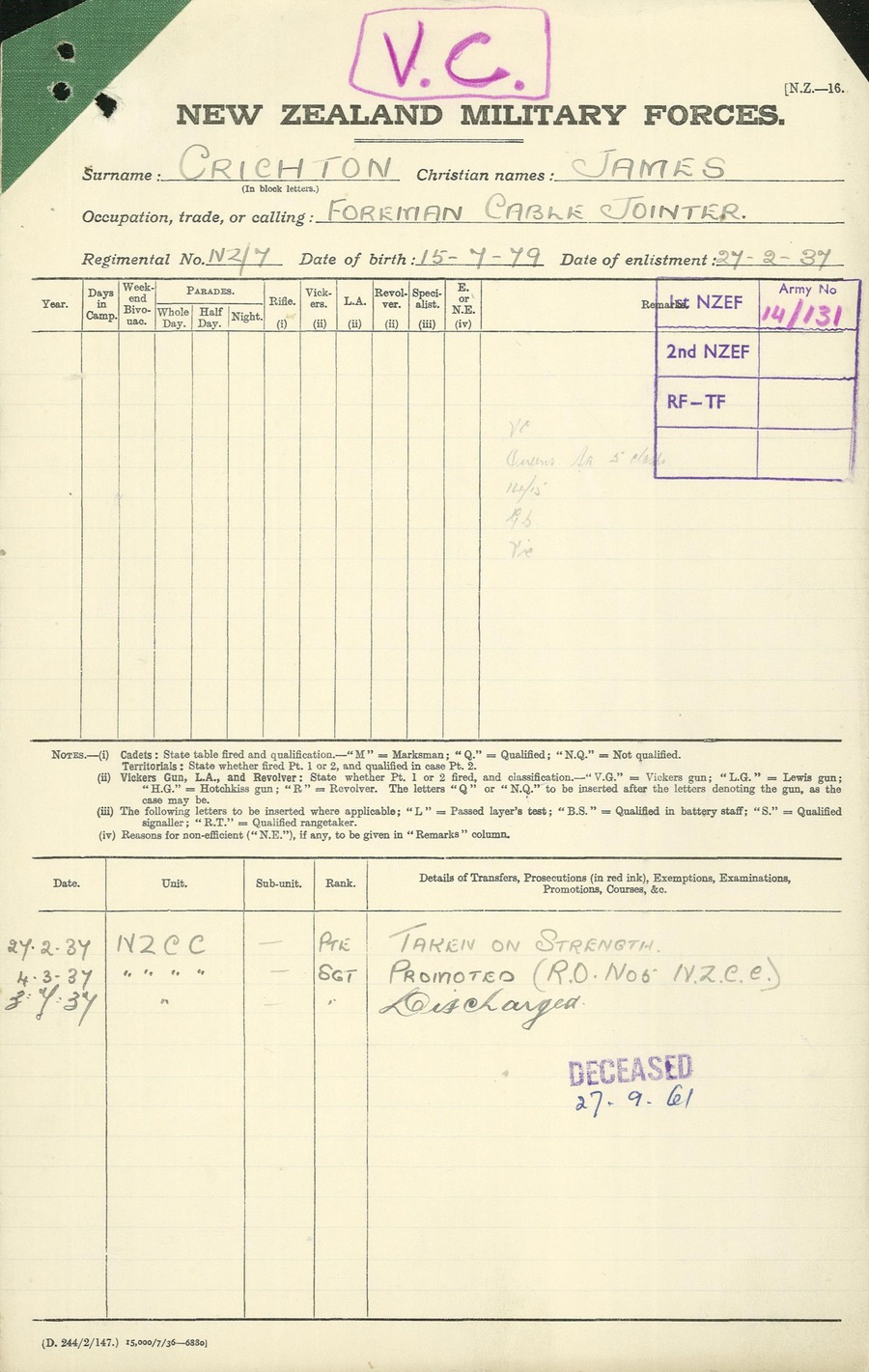
James Crichton WWI personnel file (1914 - 1918)

Following the outbreak of the First World War, Crichton volunteered for the New Zealand Military Forces and was sent to the Middle East with the main body of the New Zealand Expeditionary Force (NZEF) in October 1914. Promoted to corporal, he was posted to the New Zealand Army Service Corps (NZASC) as a baker with a field bakery. For the Gallipoli Campaign, the field bakery was part of the NZASC Divisional Train of the New Zealand and Australian Division. The NZASC divisional train was landed at Anzac Cove on 26 April 1915, and Crichton served throughout the campaign. At its conclusion, he was promoted to quartermaster sergeant. Two months later, he was promoted again, to warrant officer, 2nd class, before being sent to the Western Front.

Crichton was now serving with the 1st Field Bakery, which was part of the NZASC Divisional Train supplying the New Zealand Division. The Field Bakery numbered 92 personnel, many of whom had no experience, and was initially stationed at Rouen. It was required to produce 25,000 bread rations. As the bakers gained expertise, their output increased. By 1917, the numbers of personnel had been reduced through sickness. With no reinforcements, the burden on the remaining bakers increased. They later moved to La Mengate and then L'Hallobeau to support the troops during the Battle of Messines.

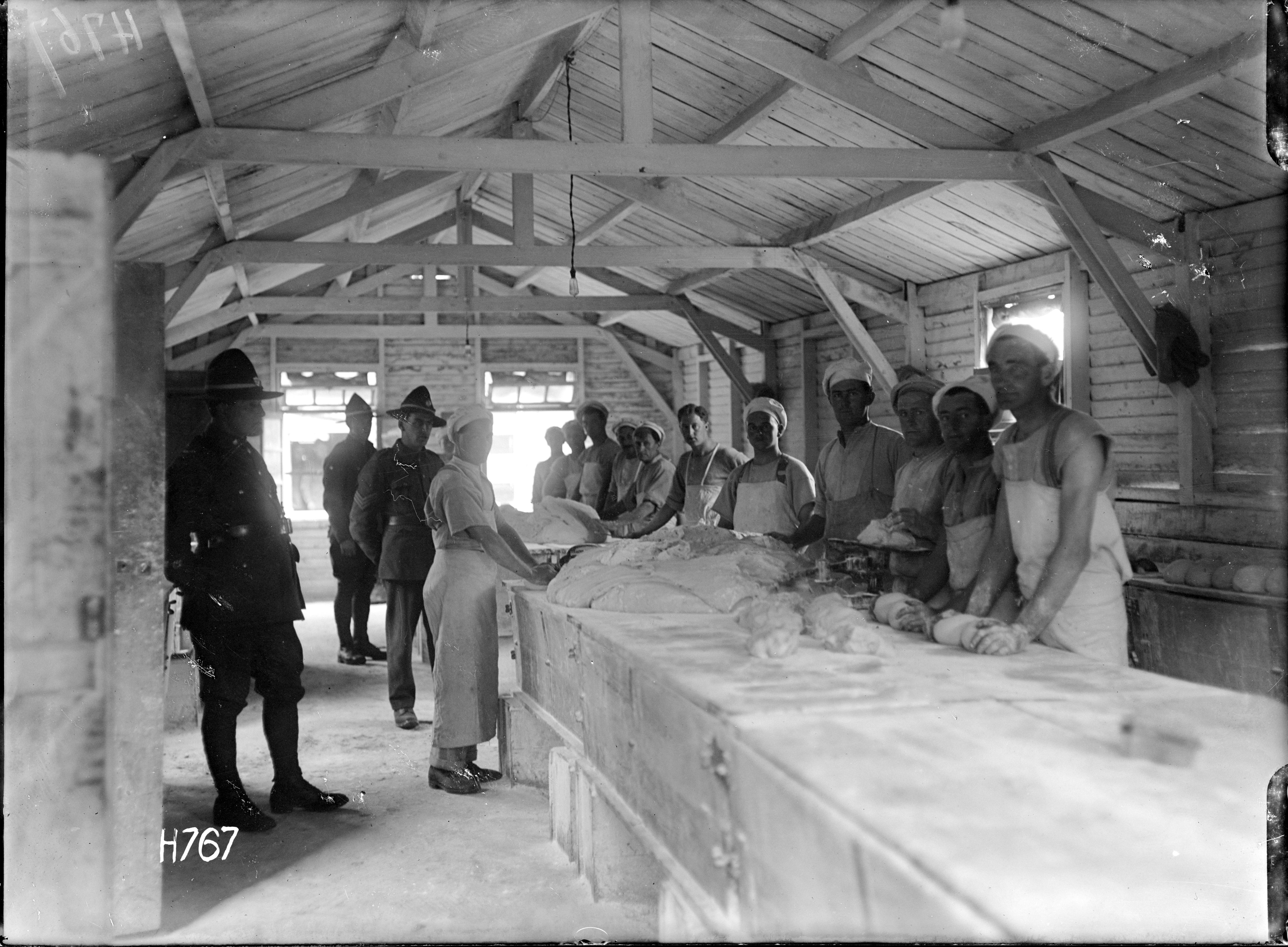
Men of the Field Bakery at work, 1918

In May 1918, having served with the 1st Field Bakery for over three years, Crichton wanted a transfer to serve with the infantry and experience frontline action. He relinquished his rank as a warrant officer and was posted to the infantry. He later stated that he had been selected for officer training with the NZASC, but a senior officer in the Auckland Infantry Regiment offered to arrange his transfer if permission was obtained. It was made clear to him that he would be reduced in rank if he proceeded with the transfer. Initially placed in the 3rd Entrenching Battalion, one of the training units of the New Zealand Division, he was transferred to the Auckland Infantry Regiment and posted to its 2nd Battalion with the rank of private in late August 1918.

On 30 September 1918, during the Hundred Days Offensive, Crichton's platoon was trying to force a crossing of the Scheldt River, near Crèvecœur, when it came under machine-gun fire. With several men killed, including the platoon commander and senior non-commissioned officer, Crichton and the remnants of the platoon were trapped on an island in the middle of the river. The bridge leading to Crèvecœur was wired for demolition. Despite a foot wound, Crichton volunteered to inform company headquarters of the platoon's situation.

Fully clothed, Crichton swam the river and despite being exposed to German gunfire as he made his way up the bank, he was able to make his report to the company's commander. He then returned to the trapped platoon, carrying a message to hold on for reinforcements. While waiting assistance from other units, Crichton decided to deal with the demolition charges on the bridges and took out the fuses and detonators. While doing so, he was exposed to gunfire from German snipers.

After he returned to his company commander to report his successful deactivation of the demolition charges, Crichton attempted to re-join his platoon but was ordered to remain behind at company headquarters. He then assisted stretcher bearers transporting wounded soldiers before the gravity of his wounds became apparent and he was taken, despite his protests, to a field hospital. He was later evacuated to England for further treatment. Promoted to sergeant, he was still recovering from his wounds when the war ended.

Crichton was awarded the Victoria Cross (VC) for his deeds of 30 September 1918. The VC, instituted in 1856, was the highest gallantry award that could be bestowed on a soldier of the British Empire. The citation for his VC read:

For most conspicuous bravery and devotion to duty when, although wounded in the foot, he continued with the advancing troops despite difficult canal and river obstacles. When his platoon was subsequently forced back by a counterattack he succeeded in carrying a message which involved swimming a river and crossing an area swept by machine-gun fire, subsequently rejoining his platoon. Later he undertook on his own initiative to save a bridge which had been mined, and, though under close fire of machine-guns and snipers, he succeeded in removing the charges, returning with the fuses and detonators. Though suffering from a painful wound he displayed the highest degree of valour and devotion to duty.

— The London Gazette, No. 31012, 15 November 1918

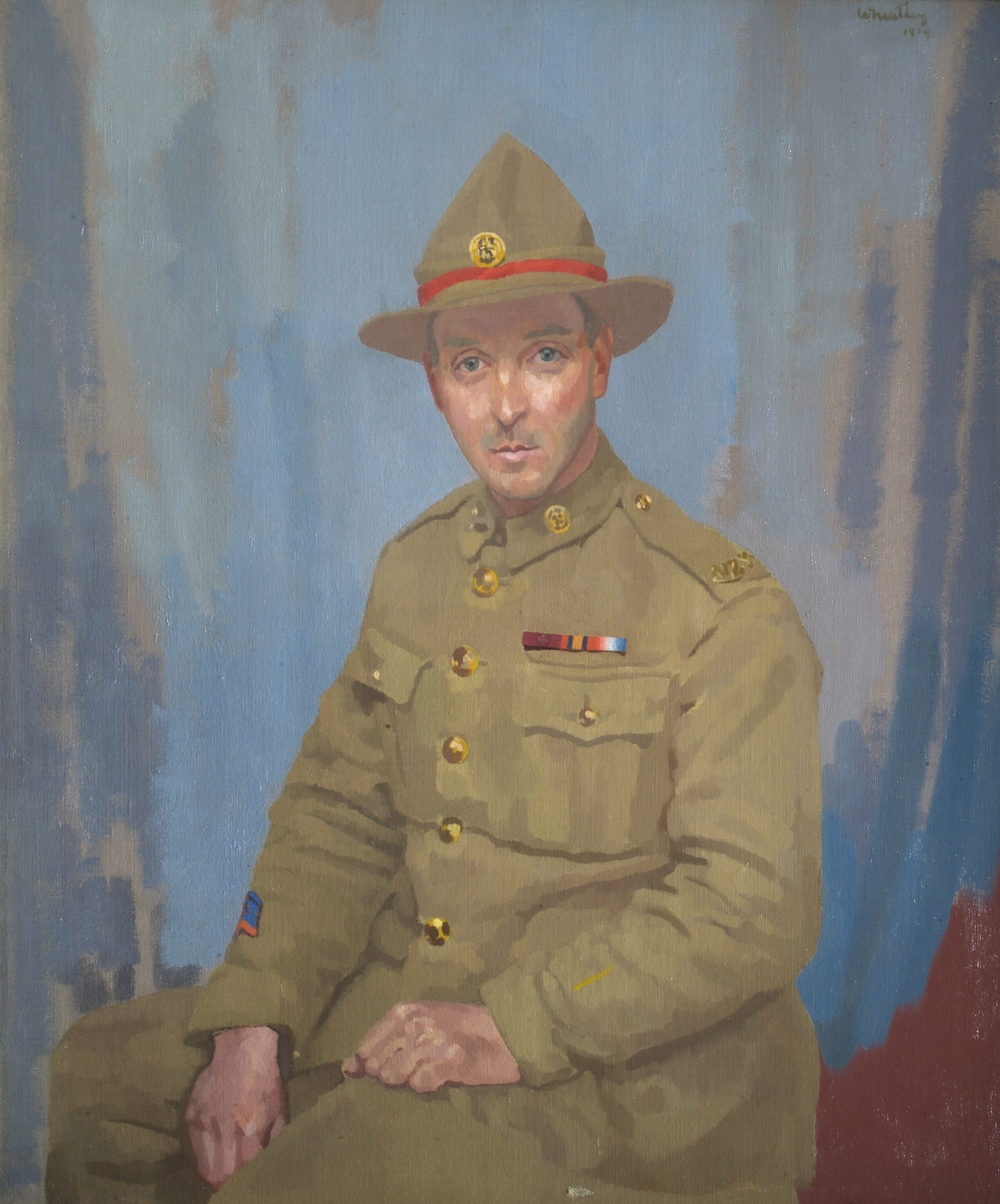
Private James Crichton, VC (1919) by John Laviers Wheatley

Crichton's VC was the last to be earned by a serviceman of the NZEF during the First World War. Together with three other New Zealanders who had been awarded the VC, (Note: These were Reginald Judson, Harry Laurent and John Grant, all second lieutenants at the time.) he received his medal from King George V in an investiture at Buckingham Palace on 27 February 1919. He returned to New Zealand in June 1919 and shortly afterwards was formally discharged from the NZEF.

== Later life and legacy ==
After leaving the military, Crichton resumed his pre-war profession as a cable splicer. In 1919 he married Amy Watkins née Howe, a war widow. The couple had two daughters. Crichton was part of the New Zealand contingent sent to London in 1937 for the coronation of King George VI and Queen Elizabeth. At the time, he was working for the New Zealand Post & Telegraph Department as a foreman. He retired two years later.

During the Second World War, Crichton served in the Home Guard and worked on merchant ships travelling between New Zealand and England. In 1953, he was awarded the Queen Elizabeth II Coronation Medal. At 76, he returned to London in 1956 as part of the VC centenary celebrations.

Crichton died at Auckland Hospital on 22 September 1961. Survived by his wife and a daughter, he was buried in Waikumete Cemetery in Auckland. Crichton's family donated his VC to the Auckland War Memorial Museum, which continues to hold the medal along with his service medals from the Boer War and the First and Second World Wars.

Several memorials are dedicated to Crichton, including a plaque on the first house in which his family lived in Carrickfergus, his place of birth, in Northern Ireland. The town's museum also has a plaque honouring Crichton and another VC recipient from Carrickfergus, Daniel Cambridge. His name is recorded on the Armadale & District Roll of Honour, which included the Scottish village of Blackridge, where he had lived as a boy. At Blackridge school where he was a pupil, a replica VC memorial stone was installed in 2018. In New Zealand, there is a plaque dedicated to him in Queen's Garden in Dunedin, and a street in the town of Hastings is named for him.

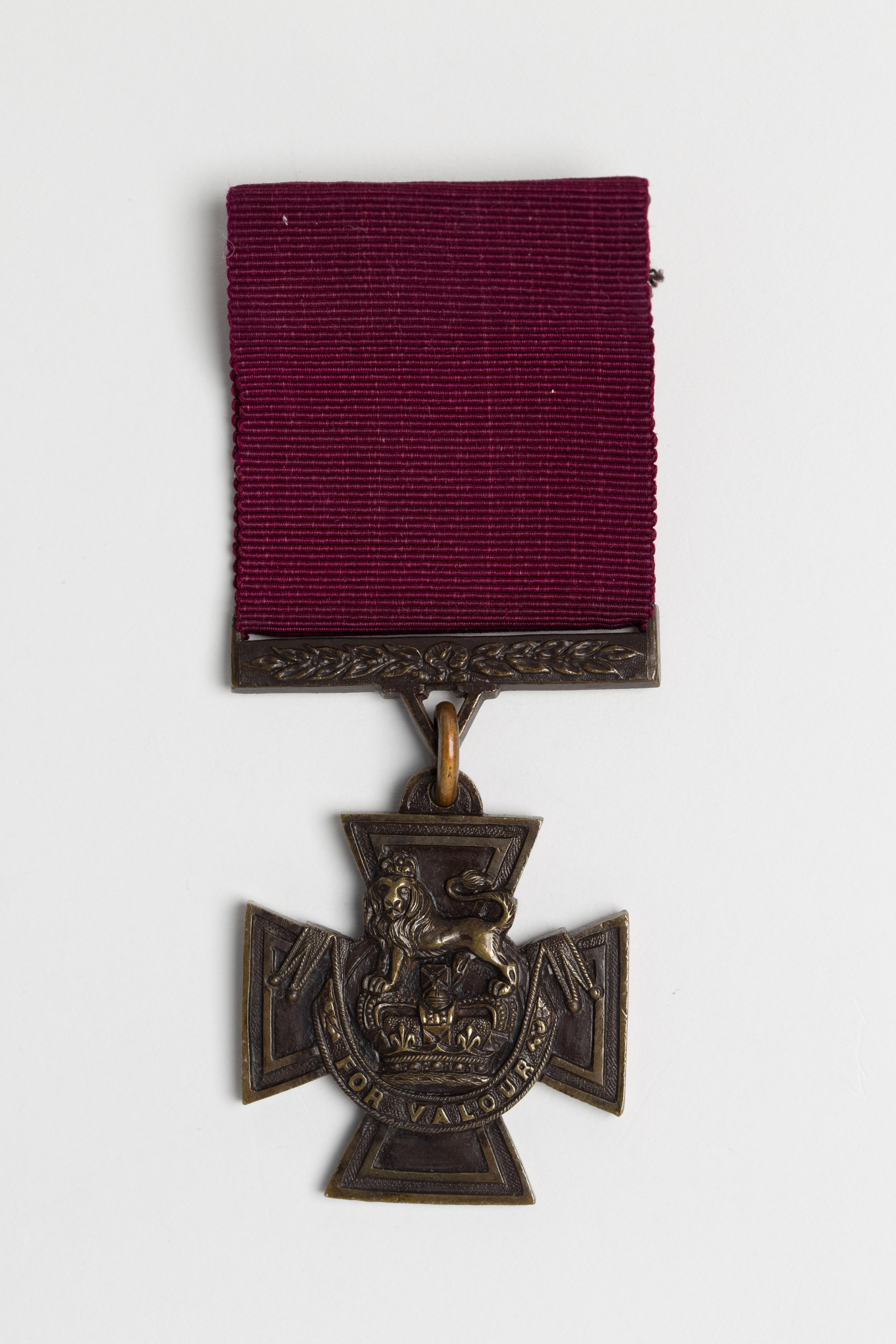
Crichton's Victoria Cross, held by the Auckland War Memorial Museum

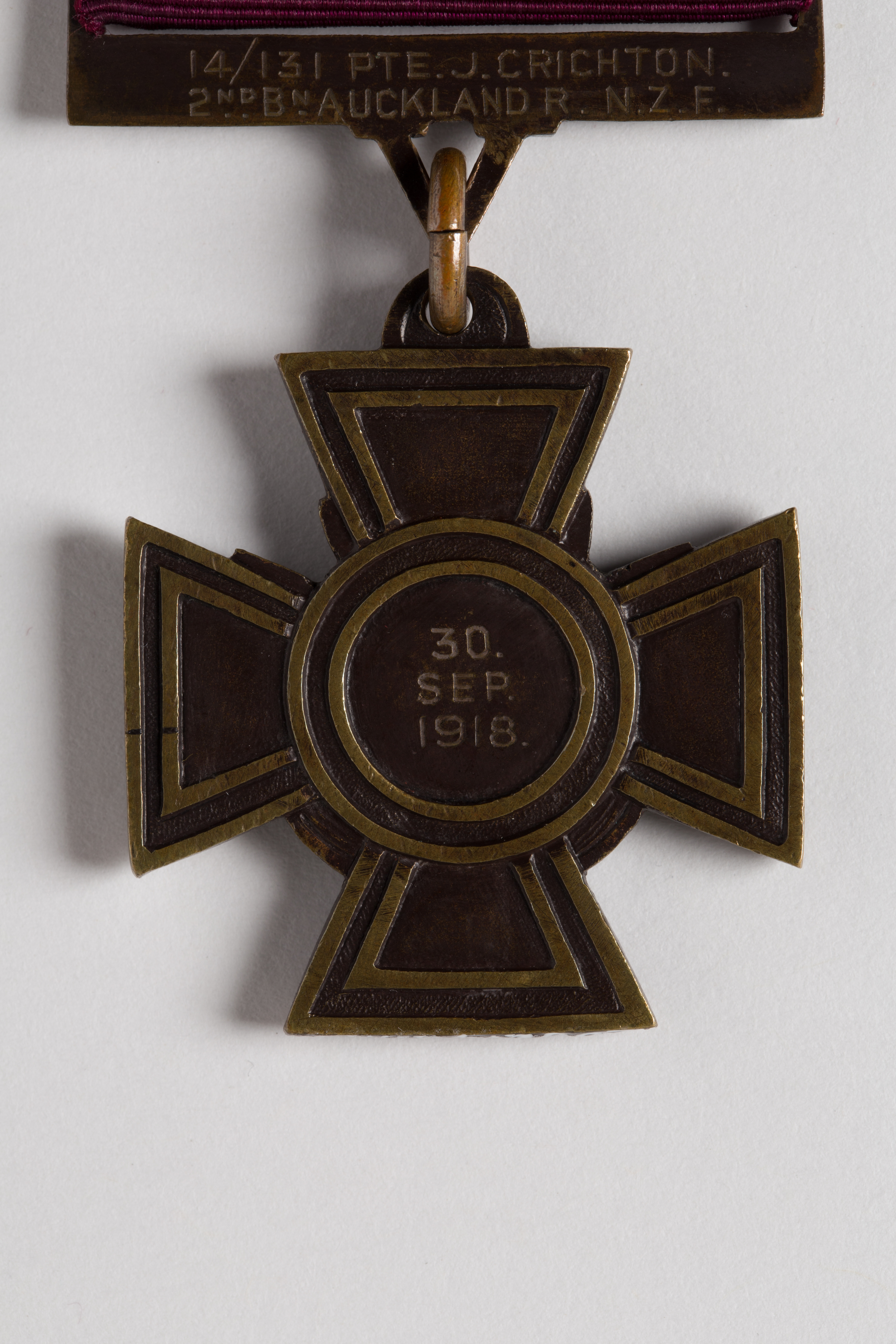
The reverse of Crichton's Victoria Cross, showing inscription
