= Samuel Forsyth =

Recipient of the Victoria Cross

Samuel Forsyth VC
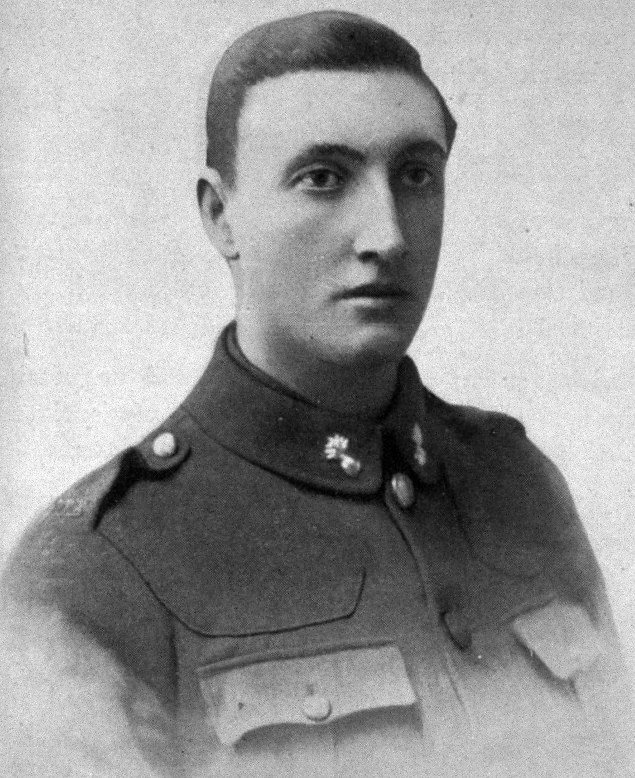
- Sergeant Samuel Forsyth, 1918
- Born: 3 April 1892; Wellington, New Zealand
- Died: 24 August 1918 (aged 26) †; Grévillers, France
- Burial place: Adanac Military Cemetery, France
- Military career
- Allegiance: New Zealand
- Branch: New Zealand Military Forces
- Service years: 1914–18
- Rank: Sergeant
- Units: New Zealand Engineers
- Conflicts: First World War; Gallipoli Campaign; Battle of Chunuk Bair (WIA); Western Front; Battle of Messines; Battle of Passchendaele; Battle of Poelcappelle; First Battle of Passchendaele; Hundred Days Offensive; Second Battle of Bapaume †
- Awards: Victoria Cross

Samuel Forsyth, VC (3 April 1892 – 24 August 1918) was a New Zealand recipient of the Victoria Cross (VC), the highest award for gallantry in the face of the enemy that could be awarded at the time to British and Commonwealth forces.

Born in 1892, Forsyth enlisted with the New Zealand Expeditionary Force shortly after the outbreak of the First World War in the summer of 1914. Serving with the New Zealand Engineers as a sapper, he participated in the Gallipoli Campaign and later fought on the Western Front. By August 1918, he was on probation to become a commissioned officer and was temporarily attached to an infantry battalion. On 24 August 1918, during the Second Battle of Bapaume, he played a key role in eliminating a machine gun nest that was holding up the advance of his battalion, but was then killed by a sniper. For this action, he was posthumously awarded the VC.

== Early life ==
Samuel Forsyth was born in Wellington, New Zealand, on 3 April 1892, one of four children of Thomas Forsyth, a night watchman on the SS Maori of Thorndon, and his wife, Grace. He attended Thorndon School and later Terrace School. After completing his education, he found employment as a gold amalgamator for the Monowai Gold Mining Company based at Thames.

Forsyth participated in charity work, volunteering for the Sailor's Friend Society. He was also interested in the military and in 1910, joined the Territorial Force in which he served as a field engineer.

== First World War ==
On 13 August 1914, shortly after the outbreak of the First World War, Forsyth enlisted in the New Zealand Expeditionary Force and embarked for the Middle East in October 1914 as a sapper with the New Zealand Engineers. Sappers who had served in the Territorials, like Forsyth, were part of the Field Troop, which numbered 83 personnel and was part of the New Zealand Mounted Rifles Brigade.

Forsyth landed at Anzac Cove in May 1915 during the Gallipoli Campaign. In the early stages of its service in the campaign, the Field Troop was posted on Walker's Ridge where it worked on deepening the trenches there. Forsyth took sick in July 1915 with influenza but after receiving treatment in Cairo, soon returned to duty at Gallipoli. He was lightly wounded during the August offensive later that year, but remained in the front-line. Suffering from jaundice, he was medically evacuated in November 1915 to the island of Lemnos and then onto England, where he spent several months in various hospitals around the country. In the meantime, the New Zealand Division had been formed and needed its allotted complement of New Zealand Engineers. To achieve this, the Field Troop was disestablished, with its personnel forming the basis of the 3rd Field Company and reinforcements bringing it up to strength.

=== Western Front ===
On recovering his health, in April 1916 Forsyth was posted to the NZEF base at Étaples before rejoining the 3rd Field Company, now serving on the Western Front in support of the New Zealand Division's 3rd Infantry Brigade. Later in the year he spent a period of leave in the United Kingdom and struck up a relationship with a Glaswegian, Mary, who he soon married. From mid-September 1916, during the New Zealand Division's involvement in the Battle of the Somme, Forsyth's company was heavily engaged in construction of roads and strongpoints and then from early October was stationed in Armentieres, now attached to the 2nd Infantry Brigade. The 3rd Field Company worked to improve the defences of the sector, which included the construction of several small dams to direct excess water towards the German trenches.

Forsyth was promoted to acting corporal in March 1917 having been made an acting lance corporal late the previous year. The 3rd Field Company was involved in the Battle of Messines of June 1917, following the infantry and constructing strongpoints in front of the village of Messines once it had been captured. During the following operations around the village of La Basseville, Forsyth was officially noted for his service. From early October, the New Zealand Engineers was involved in the maintenance of the roads during the Battle of Passchendaele, and later that month the 3rd Field Company helped in the consolidation phase of the Battle of Poelcappelle and in sorting out lines of communications and retrieving wounded in the subsequent First Battle of Passchendaele.

The following March saw the commencement of the German spring offensive and the involvement of the New Zealand Division in holding the frontline. The New Zealand Engineers built and improved defensive positions during this time. By the end of this defensive phase of the fighting, Forsyth had attained the rank of sergeant, having been promoted to this rank on 15 May 1918.

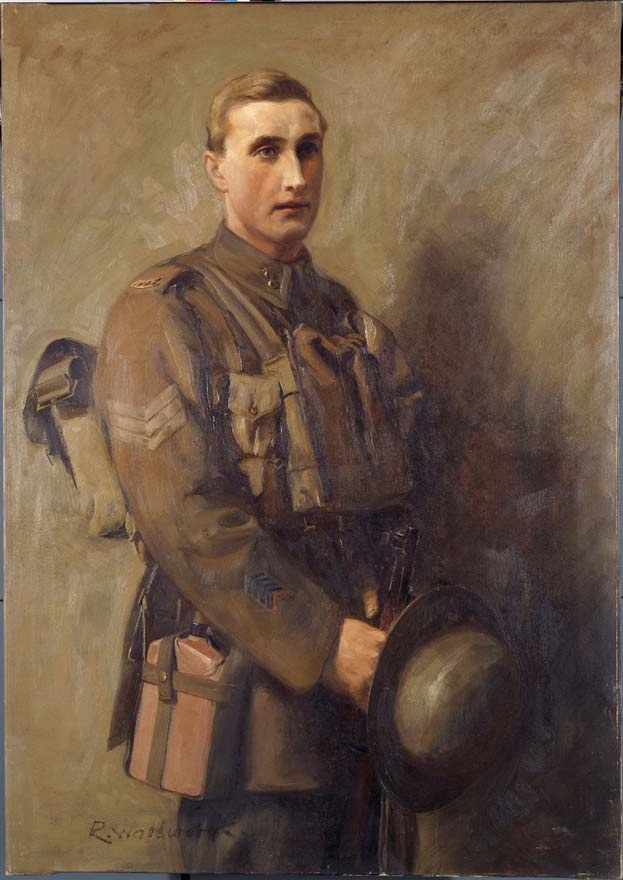
A portrait of Samuel Forsyth, executed by Richard Wallwork in 1920

In late August 1918, Forsyth was on a temporary attachment to the 2nd Battalion, Auckland Infantry Regiment, during the early stages of the Hundred Days Offensive. He was on probation for a commission in his unit and his attachment to the battalion was to gain front-line experience. On 24 August 1918, during the Second Battle of Bapaume, the battalion was ordered to capture of the village of Grévillers. On reaching the outskirts of the village, German machine gun fire prevented any further forward movement. Forsyth, scouting ahead of his platoon, made contact with two British tanks and despite being exposed to the German machine guns, guided them in, providing covering fire for the New Zealanders. One tank was soon crippled by artillery fire. Despite having been wounded in the arm, he assisted its crew to evacuate the tank and then organised them, along with several other soldiers, into a flanking party to attack the machine gun nest holding up the advance. The Germans shortly withdrew and the advance was able to continue. Forsyth set about organising defensive positions but was fatally shot by a sniper.

Forsyth's actions were instrumental in the capture of Grévillers and it was for this that he was posthumously awarded the Victoria Cross (VC). The VC, instituted in 1856, was the highest award for valour that could be bestowed on a soldier of the British Empire. The citation for Forsyth's VC read:

For most conspicuous bravery and devotion to duty in attack. On nearing the objective, his company came under heavy machine-gun fire. Through Serjt. Forsyth's dashing leadership and total disregard of danger, three machine-gun positions were rushed and the crews taken prisoner before they could inflict many casualties on our troops. During subsequent advance his company came under heavy fire from several machine guns, two of which he located by a daring reconnaissance. In his endeavour to gain support from a Tank, he was wounded, but after having the wound bandaged, he again got in touch with the Tank, which in the face of very heavy fire from machine guns and anti-Tank guns, he endeavoured to lead with magnificent coolness to a favourable position. The Tank, however, was put out of action. Serjt. Forsyth then organised the Tank crew and several of his men into a section, and led them to a position where the machine guns could be outflanked. Always under heavy fire, he directed them into positions which brought about a retirement of the enemy machine guns and enabled the advance to continue. This gallant N.C.O. was at that moment killed by a sniper. From the commencement of the attack until the time of his death Serjt. Forsyth's courage and coolness, combined with great power of initiative proved an invaluable incentive to all who were with him and he undoubtedly saved many casualties among his comrades.

— The London Gazette, No. 30967, 18 October 1918

Forsyth is one of 70 New Zealanders buried at Adanac Military Cemetery, near Miraumont in France. His name is on a memorial headstone erected by his mother Grace Forsyth at Karori Cemetery in Wellington. In the same city, a memorial tablet was erected in his honour at the premises of the Sailor's Friend Society. There is also a plaque to him in Queens Gardens in Dunedin.

== Medal ==
King George V presented Forsyth's wife, Mary, with the VC in a ceremony that took place in late November 1918 at Buckingham Palace. Following her death and having never had children, Forsyth's medals, which included not only the VC but also the 1914–15 Star, British War Medal, and the Victory Medal, were inherited by a nephew. They were sold in 1982 to a collector in Melbourne, Australia. The medals were purchased by Lord Ashcroft in 1992 and are on display in the Imperial War Museum.
