= Ruweisat Ridge =

Geographical feature in the Western Egyptian desert

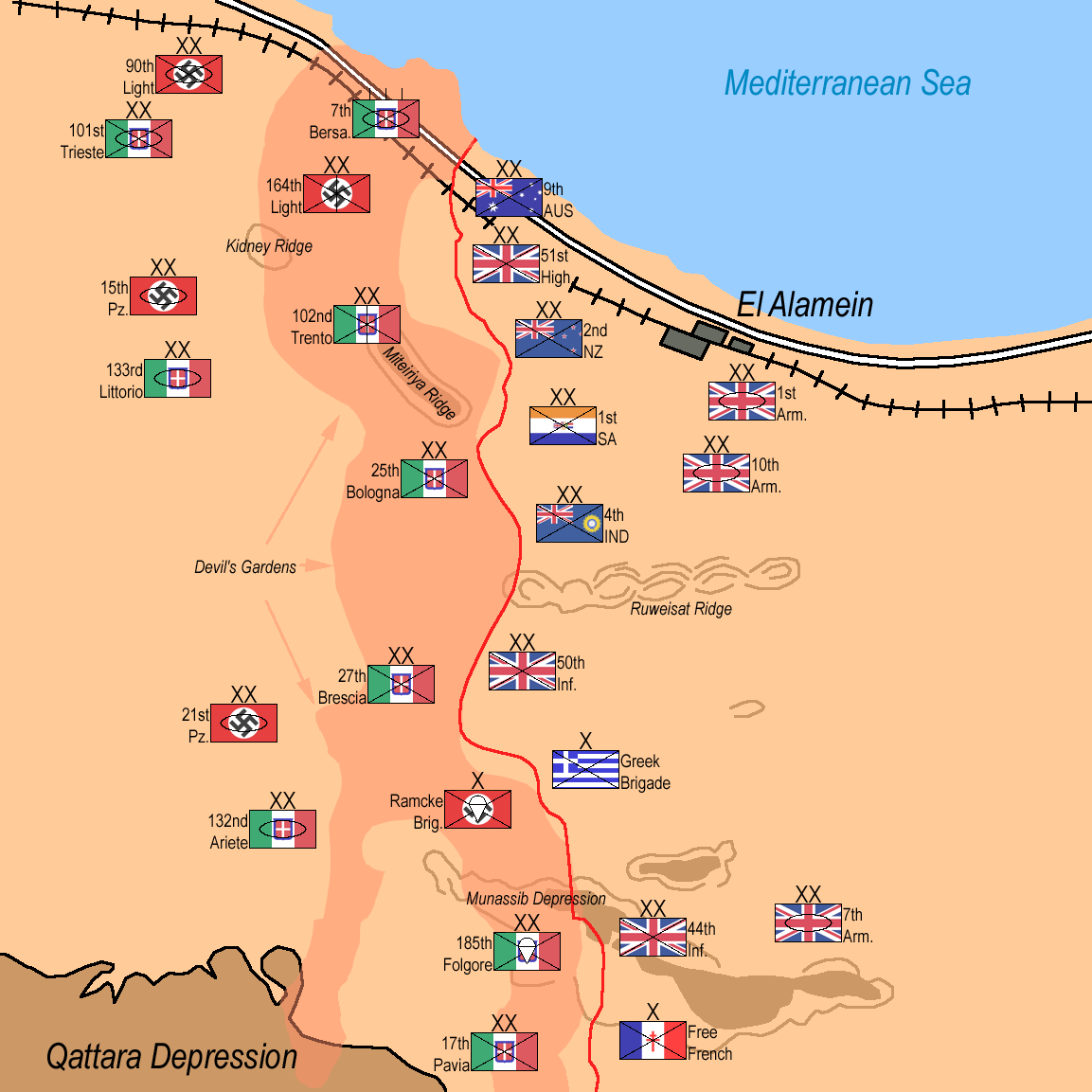
Ruweisat Ridge can be seen in the centre of the diagram.

Ruweisat Ridge is a geographical feature in the Western Egyptian desert, midway between the Mediterranean Sea and the Qattara Depression. During World War II was a prominent part of the defence line in the First and Second Battle of El Alamein.

On 1 July 1942 a notable battle was fought by 11 Field Regiment, Royal Artillery, deploying newly introduced 25-pounder field guns against Rommel's forces.

During the Second Battle of El Alamein, the 4th Indian Infantry Division was given the task of defending the feature.
