= Reginald Judson =

New Zealand Victoria Cross recipient (1881–1972)

Reginald Judson VC DCM MM
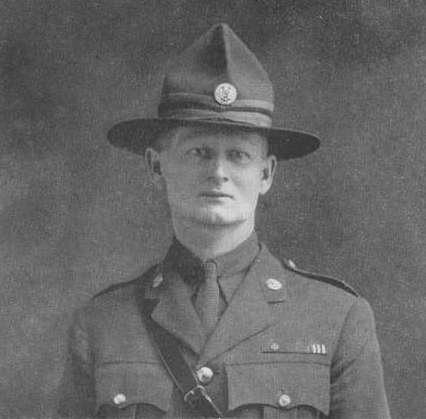
- Judson c. 1919
- Born: 29 September 1881; Wharehine, New Zealand
- Died: 26 August 1972 (aged 90); Auckland, New Zealand
- Military career
- Allegiance: New Zealand
- Branch: New Zealand Military Forces
- Service years: 1915–1937; 1939–1946
- Rank: Major
- Units: 1st Battalion, Auckland Infantry Regiment; Guards Vital Points Battalion
- Conflicts: First World War; Battle of Flers–Courcelette; Second Battle of Bapaume; Second World War
- Awards: Victoria Cross; Distinguished Conduct Medal; Military Medal

Reginald Stanley Judson, VC, DCM, MM (29 September 1881 – 26 August 1972) was a New Zealand recipient of the Victoria Cross (VC), the highest military award for gallantry "in the face of the enemy" given to British and Commonwealth forces. He was awarded the VC for his actions in the Second Battle of Bapaume during the First World War.

Born in Wharehine, Judson was a boiler maker when he enlisted in the New Zealand Expeditionary Force for service in the First World War. He was severely wounded in September 1916 during the Battle of Flers–Courcelette. After two years of medical treatment and recovery, he returned to active duty in France in June 1918. Prior to the Second Battle of Bapaume, he had already received the Distinguished Conduct Medal and the Military Medal, with all three medals being earned in a four-week period between July and August 1918. After the war he joined the New Zealand Staff Corps as a commissioned officer. He retired in 1937 and performed secretarial work as well as becoming involved in local body politics. He returned to the military during the Second World War and served on the home front. After retiring from the military for a second time in 1946, he took up farming at Mangonui in Northland. He died in Auckland in 1972, at the age of 90.

== Early life ==
Reginald Stanley Judson was born into a farming family at Wharehine, north of Auckland, in New Zealand, on 29 September 1881, the son of Emma Frances Judson (née Holmden) and Edgar William Judson. After being educated at Port Albert and completing a mechanical engineering apprenticeship, he worked as a boilermaker and engineer in Auckland, living in the suburb of Ponsonby. In 1905 he married Ethel Grice and the union resulted in four children.

== First World War ==
Judson enlisted in the New Zealand Expeditionary Force (NZEF) in October 1915 and embarked for the Middle East in January 1916 as a reinforcement with the New Zealand Rifle Brigade. In February, shortly after arriving in Egypt where the New Zealand Division was in the process of being formed, he was transferred to 1st Battalion, Auckland Infantry Regiment. Two months later, the division was transferred to the Western Front. Promoted to corporal, he participated in the Battle of Flers-Courcelette on 15 September 1916, where he was seriously wounded. He was evacuated to England and spent several months recovering from his injuries. Once his health permitted, he performed training duties and then spent a period of time in charge of a Royal Engineers depot in Codford.

In June 1918, Judson, now a sergeant, returned to his battalion which, along with the rest of the New Zealand Division, was engaged in fighting on the Somme in France. Late the following month, he rescued six of his fellow soldiers during a German counterattack near Hebuterne. For this action, he was recommended for the Distinguished Conduct Medal (DCM). On 16 August, he was at the forefront of a bayonet charge at Bucquoy that earned him the Military Medal (MM).

Ten days later, Judson participated in the Second Battle of Bapaume, an early engagement of the Hundred Days Offensive. The actions which led to Judson being awarded the Victoria Cross (VC), the DCM and the MM took place over a period of just four weeks. The citation for Judson's VC was published in the same edition of the London Gazette as the citation for his DCM. His VC citation read as follows:

For most conspicuous bravery and devotion to duty when, in an attack on enemy positions, he led a small bombing party under heavy fire and captured an enemy machine-gun. He then proceeded up the sap alone, bombing three machine-gun crews before him. Jumping out of the trench he ran ahead of the enemy. Then, standing on the parapet, he ordered the party, consisting of two officers and about ten men, to surrender. They instantly fired on him, but he threw a bomb and jumped down amongst them, killed two, and put the rest to flight, and so captured two machine-guns. This prompt and gallant action not only saved many lives, but also enabled the advance to be continued unopposed.

— The London Gazette, No. 30982, 30 October 1918

In September, Judson was a victim of a gas attack and returned to England to recover his health. He then attended an officer training school, first at Cambridge and then at Aldershot. By this time the war had ended and it was not until February 1919 that Judson was commissioned as a second lieutenant.

== Interwar period ==
Before departing England, Judson, along with three other New Zealanders who had been awarded the VC, (Note: These were James Crichton, a private at the time, and Second Lieutenants Harry Laurent and John Grant.) received his medal from King George V in a ceremony at Buckingham Palace on 27 February 1919. After an extended stay in hospital, he left for New Zealand in June 1919.

Discharged from the NZEF in October 1919 and having decided on a career as a professional soldier, Judson joined the New Zealand Staff Corps. He served in posts in Auckland and then New Plymouth, where he was the area officer. Due to his war wounds (eight fragments of shrapnel remained in his chest and abdomen) and the aftereffects of his gassing, his health was fragile, and he had two periods of extended sick leave in 1924 and 1934. Despite being regarded as a reliable and conscientious officer, promotion opportunities in the postwar Staff Corps were limited, and when he retired in 1937, it was with the rank of captain.

Judson's marriage to Ethel had ended in divorce in 1920. Eight years later he married Kate Lewis, a war widow, and had a fifth child. On his retirement, Judson's pension was insufficient to support him and his children. Unable to return to his civilian trade of engineering due to poor health, he found employment as a secretary at a school in Auckland. A year later, he was voted onto Auckland City Council for the Citizens and Ratepayers Association and served for nine years. He was one of six candidates who stood for selection for the Auckland East electorate by the National Party for the 1938 election, but Harry Merritt was chosen instead.

== Later life ==
Following the outbreak of the Second World War, Judson volunteered for military service. To be eligible, he deceived the authorities about his age. He served on the home front for the duration of the war, commanding the Guards Vital Points Battalion in Auckland. He retired from the military in September 1946 with the rank of major.

In 1953, Judson was awarded the Queen Elizabeth II Coronation Medal.

Judson moved to Mangonui in Northland and took up farming. He was also community minded, and served as a justice of the peace as well as being a coroner. He retired in the late 1950s, and returned to Auckland where he died on 26 August 1972. He was buried at Waikumete Cemetery, survived by his wife and four children. One of his sons, Reginald, served in the Second World War with the 24th Battalion as a chaplain and won the Military Cross during the Italian Campaign.

== Medal ==
Judson's Victoria Cross was displayed at the QEII Army Memorial Museum, Waiouru. On 2 December 2007 it was one of nine Victoria Crosses that were among a hundred medals stolen from the museum. On 16 February 2008, New Zealand Police announced all the medals had been recovered as a result of a NZ$300,000 reward offered by Michael Ashcroft and Tom Sturgess.
