= Samuel Frickleton =

New Zealand soldier

Samuel Frickleton VC ED
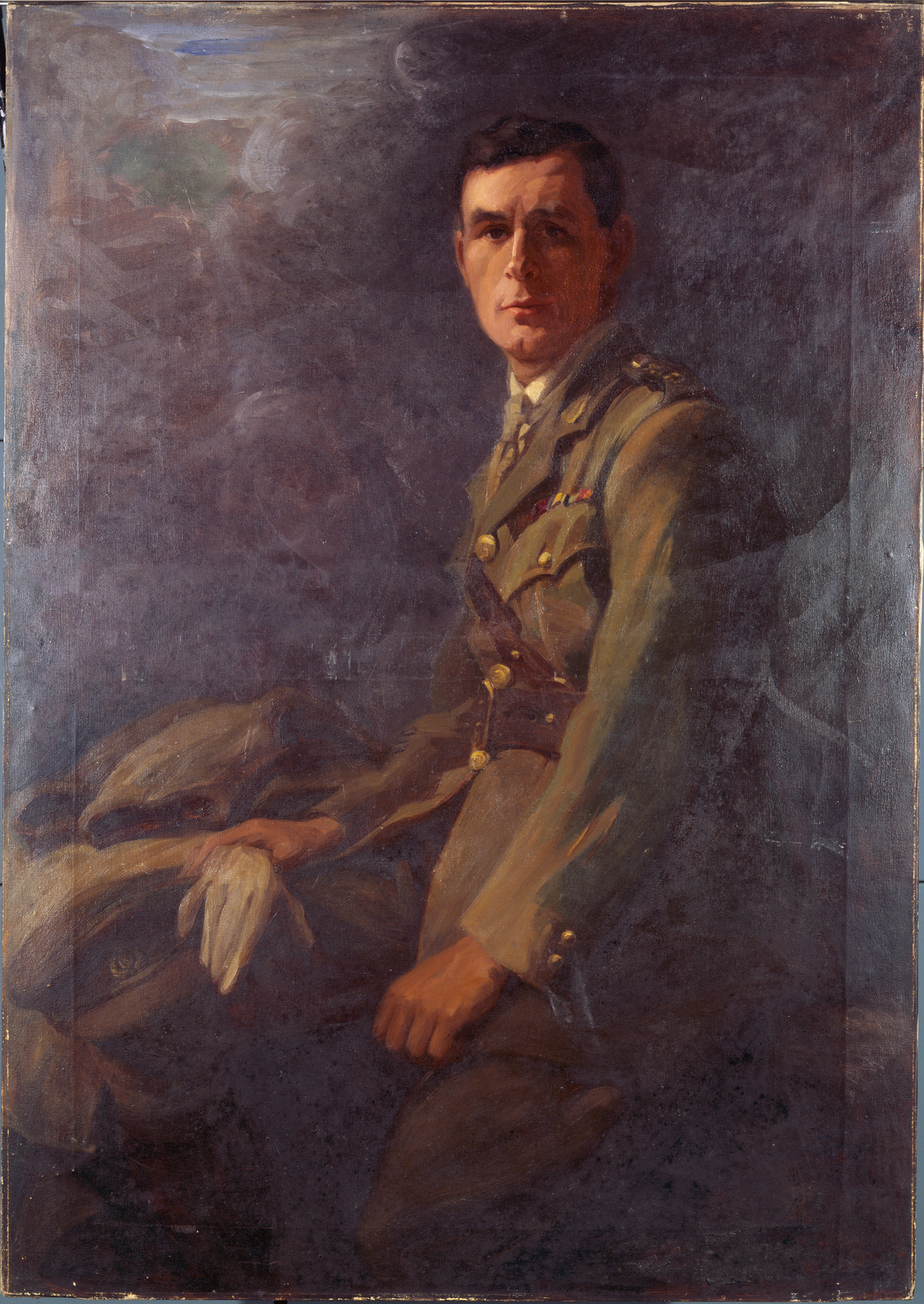
- A portrait of Frickleton by Mollie Tripe
- Born: 1 April 1891; Slamannan, Stirlingshire, Scotland
- Died: 1 September 1971 (aged 80); Wellington, New Zealand
- Military career
- Allegiance: New Zealand
- Branch: New Zealand Military Forces
- Service years: 1915–1927; 1934–1937; 1939–1948
- Rank: Captain
- Units: 3rd Battalion, New Zealand Rifle Brigade
- Conflicts: First World War; Western Front; Battle of Messines (WIA); Second World War
- Awards: Victoria Cross; Efficiency Decoration

Samuel Frickleton, VC, ED (1 April 1891 – 1 September 1971) was a Scottish born soldier in the New Zealand Military Forces and a recipient of the Victoria Cross (VC), the highest award of the British Commonwealth for gallantry in the face of the enemy.

Born in 1891 in Scotland, Frickleton moved to New Zealand in 1913 and was a miner when he enlisted with the New Zealand Expeditionary Force (NZEF) the year after the outbreak of the First World War. He took ill on reaching the Middle East and had to be repatriated to New Zealand. Although he had been discharged from the NZEF, he rejoined after recovering his health. He was posted to the 3rd Battalion, New Zealand Rifle Brigade, then serving on the Western Front. Wounded during the Battle of Messines when he destroyed two machine gun posts, an action that earned him the VC, he received medical treatment in England. He then underwent officer training but his health was still poor and before the end of the war he was returned to New Zealand.

Post war, Frickleton served in the New Zealand Staff Corps before returning to civilian life in 1927. He tried farming and worked as a house manager. In the mid-1930s, Frickleton joined the part time Territorial Force and would be later awarded the Efficiency Decoration (ED). He went to London in 1937 for the coronation of King George VI and Queen Elizabeth and again nearly 20 years later for the VC centenary. He served on the home front during the Second World War, and eventually retired from the military in 1948. He died in 1971 at the age of 80.

== Early life ==
Frickleton was born on 1 April 1891 in Slamannan, Scotland, one of 11 children born to Samuel Frickleton, a coal miner, and his wife Elizabeth. Following the death of his father, he immigrated to New Zealand in 1913, with his mother and several of her children, to join an older brother who was living in Blackball on the West Coast. He and four of his brothers all worked in a mine in the town, extracting coal.

== First World War ==
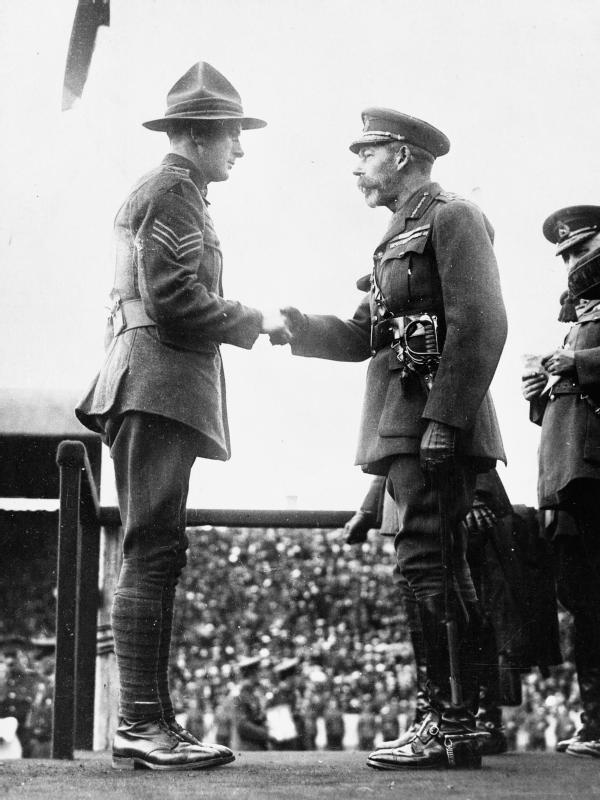
Frickleton being invested with the Victoria Cross by King George V

Following the outbreak of the First World War, Frickleton joined the New Zealand Military Forces in February 1915 and volunteered to serve overseas with the New Zealand Expeditionary Force (NZEF). His four brothers had also volunteered for the NZEF.

Frickleton embarked for the Middle East with the 5th Reinforcements with the rank of corporal in the Canterbury Battalion. After arriving in Egypt in June, he became ill with tuberculosis, was repatriated to New Zealand and subsequently discharged from the NZEF as medically unfit for active service. After a period of convalescence at a medical facility near Dunedin, he re-enlisted in the NZEF in 1916 and sent to England with the 15th Reinforcements. Initially a rifleman (equivalent to a private), later that year he was posted to France to join the 3rd Battalion, New Zealand Rifle Brigade. By March 1917, he had been promoted to corporal.

On 7 June 1917, Frickleton participated in the Battle of Messines. His battalion, covered by artillery fire, was attacking the edge of the village of Messines, now known as Mesen, when it was slowed by two machine gun posts. Frickleton, wounded in the arm, led his section in an attack on the machine gun posts. With the barrage of artillery concealing their approach, he threw a grenade that destroyed one machine gun and rushed forward with a bayonet to deal with the survivors of its crew. He similarly dealt with the other machine gun, making a solo attack under the covering gunfire of his section. He continued to remain involved in the fighting in Messines until being wounded again, this time in the hip. He also was badly gassed which, with his wounds, saw him taken from the battlefield for treatment.

Frickleton was awarded a Victoria Cross (VC) for his actions in dealing with the machine gun posts in Messines. The VC, instituted in 1856, was the highest gallantry award that could be bestowed on a soldier of the British Empire. The citation for Frickleton's award read as follows:

For most conspicuous bravery and determination when with attacking troops, which came under heavy fire and were checked. Although slightly wounded, Lance Corporal Frickleton dashed forward at the head of his section, rushed through a barrage and personally destroyed with bombs an enemy machine gun and crew, which were causing heavy casualties. He then attacked the second gun, killing the whole of the crew of twelve. By the destruction of these two guns he undoubtedly saved his own and other units from very severe casualties and his magnificent courage and gallantry ensured the capture of the objective. During the consolidation of the position he suffered a second severe wound. He set, throughout, a great example of heroism.

— London Gazette, No. 30215, 2 August 1917.

Evacuated to England for medical treatment, Frickleton's wounds would affect his health for the remainder of his life. He was presented with his VC by King George V on 17 September 1917, in a ceremony at Ibrox Park, Glasgow. By then he was an acting sergeant, which was confirmed later that year. After a period of further hospitalisation, he was selected for and underwent officer training. He was commissioned as a second lieutenant in March 1918 and returned to the Rifle Brigade. However, his health problems persisted and he again was repatriated to New Zealand in June 1918.

The first of the VC recipients of the NZEF to return to New Zealand, Frickleton was accorded a hero's welcome. A reception was held in Frickleton's honour at the Auckland Town Hall. He spent the remainder of the year under medical care before being discharged from the NZEF in December 1918. Of his brothers who also served in the war, one was killed in the Battle of the Somme, and three others were wounded.

== Later life ==
After the war, Frickleton transferred to the New Zealand Staff Corps. He was promoted to acting lieutenant and served as assistant provost marshal for the Wellington Military District for several months until June 1919. He was then transferred to the Canterbury Military District. For health reasons, he retired from the military with the rank of captain in April 1927.

In civilian life he tried several professions. At first, he took up business in Wellington and then tried farming at Waikanae. He later worked as a house manager. His poor health notwithstanding, in 1934 he joined the Territorial Force with the rank of captain. He was later awarded the Efficiency Decoration (ED) for his long service in the military. He was part of the New Zealand contingent sent to London in 1937 for the coronation of King George VI and Queen Elizabeth. He was returned to the Officer Reserve the same year. On the outbreak of the Second World War, Frickleton was unsuccessful in his attempt to enlist in the 2nd New Zealand Expeditionary Force being raised for overseas service. Instead he served on the home front as Inspector, New Zealand Military Forces, for the duration of the war. He was returned to the Retired List in 1948.

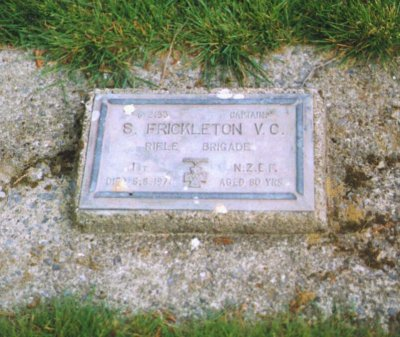
Frickleton's grave at Taita Serviceman's Cemetery

In his later years, Frickleton worked for the Colonial Motor Company as a clerk. In 1956, he was one of 400 VC winners who paraded in Hyde Park in London for the VC centenary. He died on 1 September 1971 in Wellington after a long illness. He was survived by his wife, Valeska née Gembitzsky whom he married in 1922, and a son. He is buried in the Taita Serviceman's Cemetery, Naenae.

== Medals ==
In 1977, Frickleton's wife donated his VC and other medals which in addition to the ED, included the 1914-15 Star, the British War Medal, the Victory Medal, the King George VI Coronation Medal, and the Queen Elizabeth II Coronation Medal, to the National Army Museum in Waiouru. The VC was on display when it was one of nine Victoria Crosses that were among a hundred medals stolen from the museum in December 2007. On 16 February 2008, New Zealand Police announced all the medals had been recovered as a result of a NZ$300,000 reward offered by Michael Ashcroft and Tom Sturgess.

== Legacy ==
There are several memorials to his memory; a plaque commemorating his bravery was unveiled on 7 June 2007 at the Mesen Church in Belgium in a ceremony attended by two of his granddaughters. There is also a plaque in his honour at the Messines Ridge British Cemetery and a memorial cairn in Slamannan, his place of birth. In 2010, a barracks at Burnham Military Camp was named for him.
