= Bancourt =

- Commune
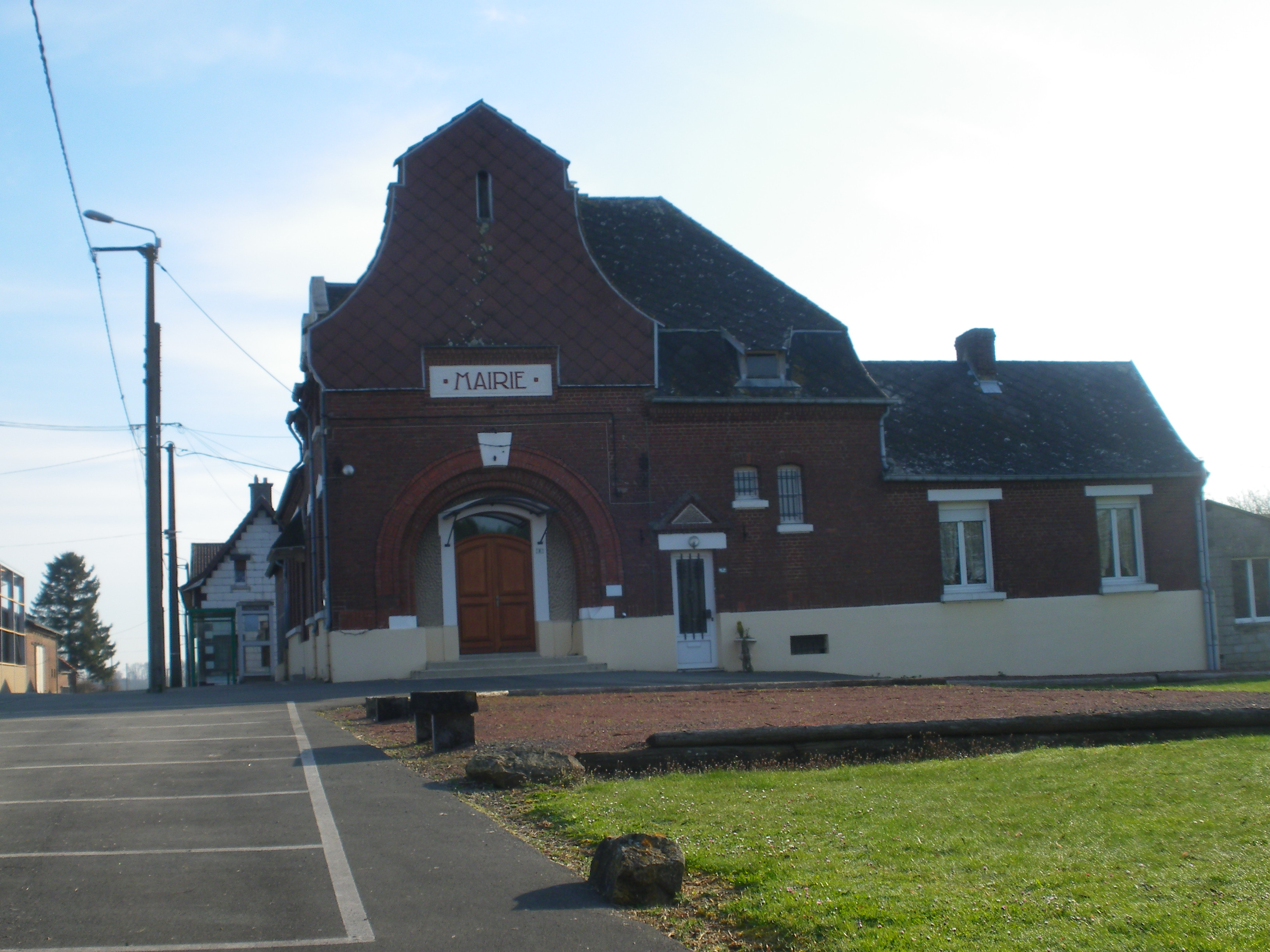
- The town hall of Bancourt

- Coat of arms
- Location of Bancourt
- Location within France Location within Hauts-de-France
- Coordinates: 50°06′05″N 2°53′20″E
- Country: France
- Region: Hauts-de-France
- Department: Pas-de-Calais
- Arrondissement: Arras
- Canton: Bapaume
- Intercommunality: CC du Sud-Artois

Government
  - Mayor (2020–2026): Bernard Rousere
- Area^{1}: 4.54 km^{2} (1.75 sq mi)
- Elevation: 114 m (374 ft)
- Highest elevation: 132 m (433 ft)
- Lowest elevation: 104 m (341 ft)
- Population (2023): 83
  - Density: 18/km^{2} (47/sq mi)
- Time zone: UTC+01:00 (CET)
  - Summer (DST): UTC+02:00 (CEST)
- INSEE/Postal code: 62079 /62450
- ^{1} French Land Register data, which excludes lakes, ponds, glaciers > 1 km^{2} (0.386 sq mi or 247 acres) and river estuaries.

Bancourt (French pronunciation: [bɑ̃kuʁ]) is a commune in Pas-de-Calais, a department in the Hauts-de-France region in northern France.

== Geography ==
A small farming village located 10 miles (16 km) south of Arras at the junction of the D7 and D7E1 roads.

== Population ==
Historical population
Year	Pop.	±% p.a.
1968	123	—
1975	114	−1.08%
1982	112	−0.25%
1990	101	−1.28%
1999	95	−0.68%
2007	79	−2.28%
2012	80	+0.25%
2017	87	+1.69%
2023	83	−0.78%
Source: INSEE

== Notable sites ==
- The Bancourt British Cemetery.

== See also ==
- Communes of the Pas-de-Calais department
