= David Russell =

David Russell may refer to:

== Sports people ==
- Dave Russell (footballer) (1914–2000), Scottish footballer
- David A. Russell (golfer) (born 1957), English professional golfer
- David J. Russell (golfer) (born 1954), English professional golfer
- David Russell (cricketer, born 1936), English cricketer
- David Russell (cricketer, born 1951), English cricketer
- David Russell (Scottish footballer) (1862–1918), Scottish footballer
- David Russell (racing driver) (born 1982), Australian racing driver
- David Russell (Gaelic footballer), Gaelic footballer from County Clare
- David Russell (basketball) (born 1960), American basketball player
- Davie Russell (1871–1952), Scottish footballer

== Military ==
- Sir David Russell (British Army officer) (1809–1884), British general
- David Russell (GC) (1911–1945), lance corporal with the 22nd Battalion, New Zealand Infantry, 2nd NZEF
- David Allen Russell (1820–1864), United States Army officer
- David Russell (Royal Navy officer) (born 1952), first captain of HMS Vanguard
- David F. O. Russell (1915–1993), British businessman and philanthropist

== Politicians ==
- David Abel Russell (1780–1861), U.S. representative from New York
- David J. Russell (politician) (1931–2023), politician from Alberta, Canada
- David Russell, 5th Baron Ampthill (born 1947), British publisher and politician, heir to Baron Ampthill
- David Russell (New Hampshire politician), American politician

== Others ==
- Sir David Russell (businessman) (1872–1956) Scottish businessman and philanthropist
- David Russell (bishop) (1938–2014), Anglican bishop
- David Russell (barrister) (born 1950), Australian barrister
- David Russell (guitarist) (born 1953), classical guitarist
- David Lynn Russell (born 1942), U.S. federal judge
- David O. Russell (born 1958), American film director and screenwriter
- David R. Russell (1935–2018), collector of antique woodworking tools
- David Syme Russell (1916–2010), British theologian and author
- Davy Russell (born 1979), Irish jockey
- Davy Russell (politician) (born 1961/1962), Scottish politician
