= 7th Massachusetts Infantry Regiment =

7th Regiment Massachusetts Volunteer Infantry
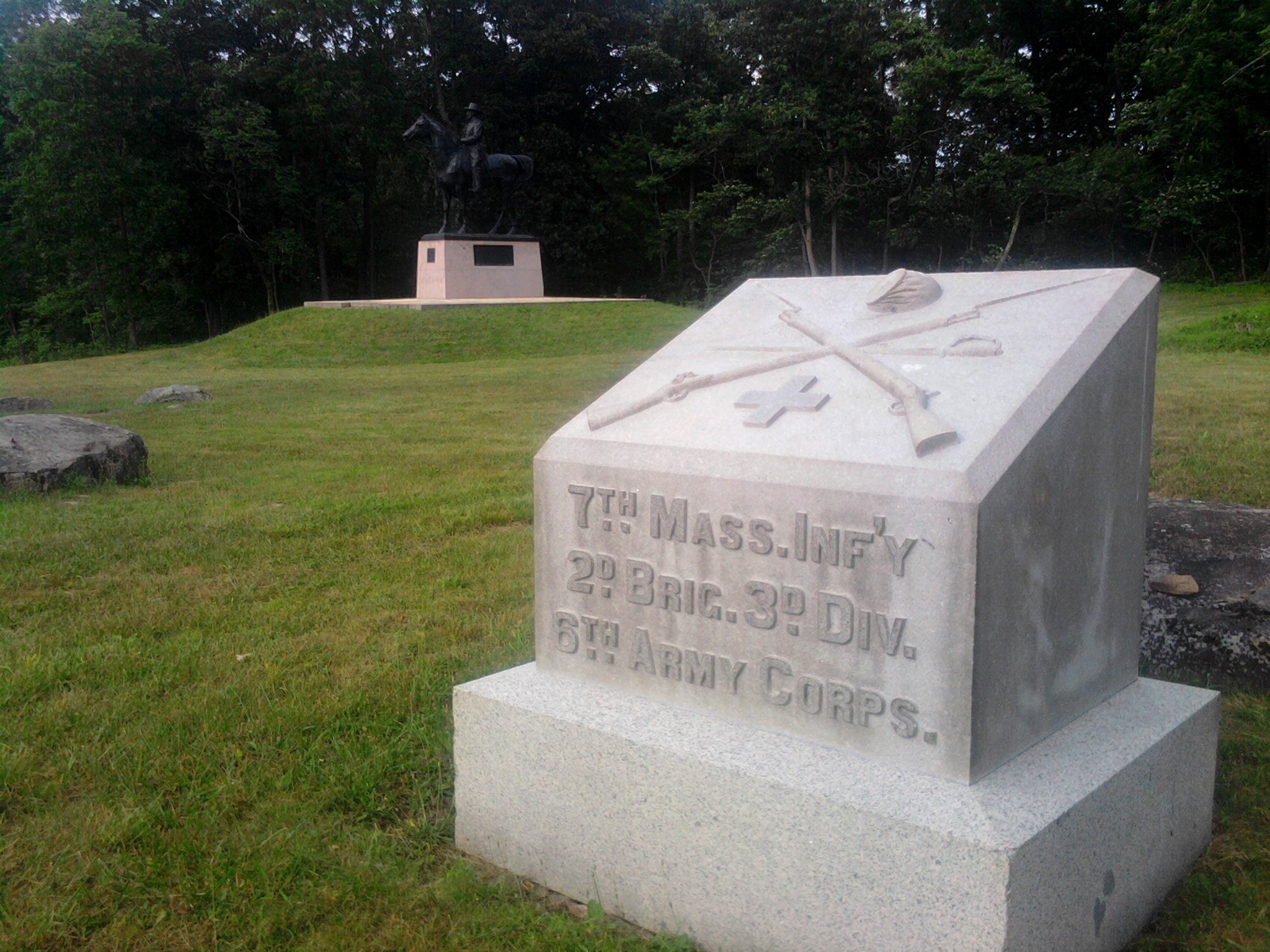
- The 7th Massachusetts Regimental Monument on the Gettysburg Battlefield with an equestrian statue of Major General John Sedgwick in the background
- Active: June 15, 1861–July 5, 1864
- Country: United States of America
- Allegiance: Union
- Branch: Union Army
- Type: Infantry
- Part of: In 1863: 2nd Brigade (Eustis's), 3rd Division (Newton's), VI Corps, Army of the Potomac

Commanders
- Notable commanders: Colonel (later Major General) Darius N. Couch; Colonel (later Brigadier General) Nelson H. Davis; Colonel (later Brigadier General) David Allen Russell

Insignia
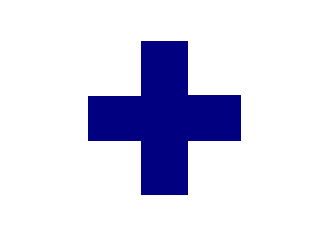
- VI Corps badge (3rd Division)

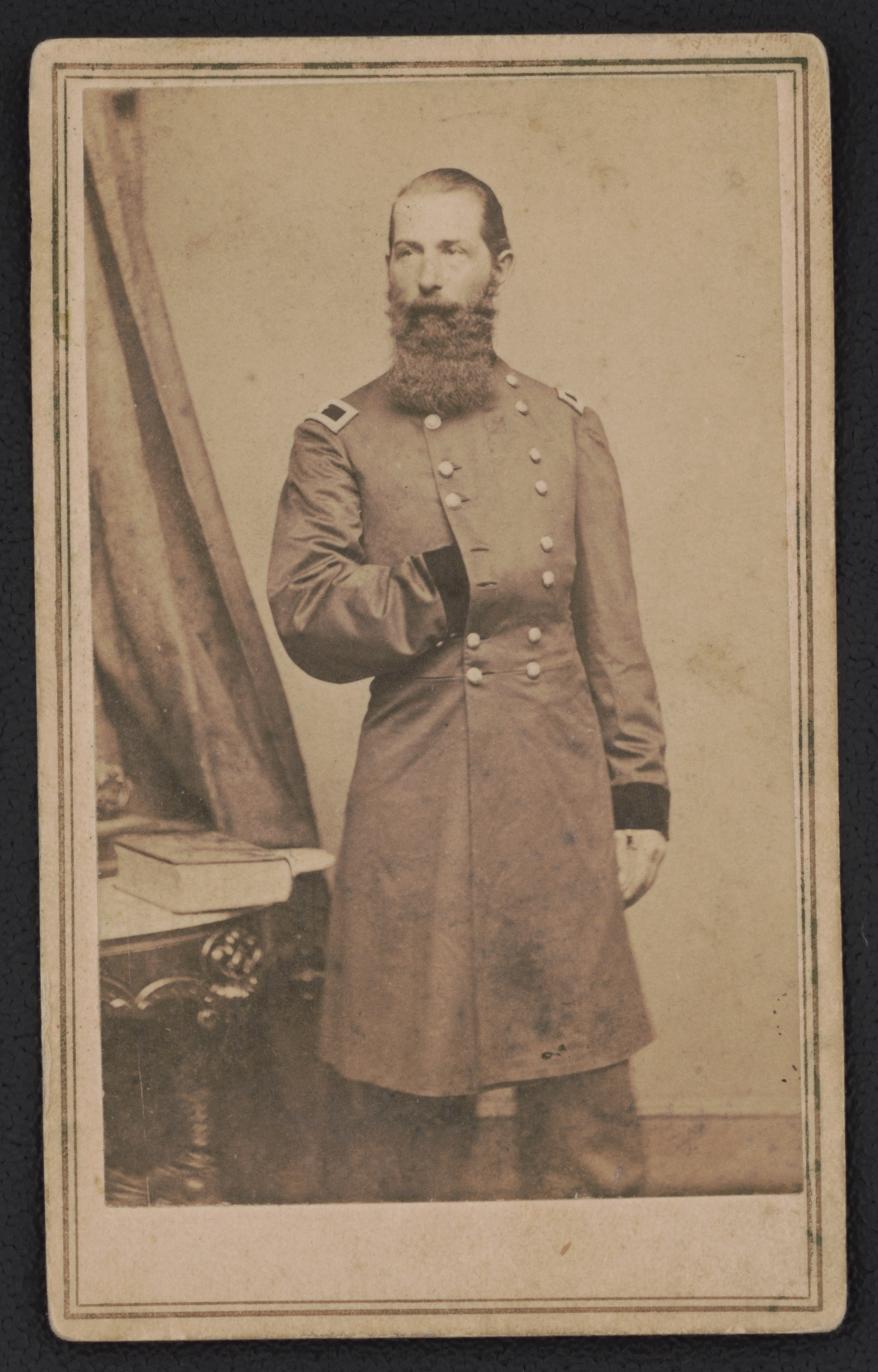
Major General David Allen Russell of 7th Massachusetts Infantry Regiment. From the Liljenquist Family Collection of Civil War Photographs, Prints and Photographs Division, Library of Congress. Mathew Brady, photographer

The 7th Regiment Massachusetts Volunteer Infantry was an infantry regiment in the Union army during the American Civil War. It was formed on June 15, 1861, in Taunton. Its original commander was Colonel Darius N. Couch who would eventually be promoted to command the II Corps of the Army of the Potomac and, after that, the Department of the Susquehanna.

== Organization and early duty ==
The 7th Massachusetts consisted almost entirely of men from Bristol County, Massachusetts. The regiment was trained at Camp Old Colony in Taunton, Massachusetts. On June 15, 1861, its members were mustered into service.

On July 11, the 7th Massachusetts left for Washington, D.C. where it remained encamped until the spring of 1862. For most of that period, the regiment was stationed in Brightwood, now a neighborhood of Washington but, at the time, outside of the urban area of the city. There they worked with other regiments to construct a defensive fortification known as Fort Stevens. The conditions at Fort Stevens were favorable as compared to many winter camps during the Civil War and the regiment had a very low rate of sickness.

During their first winter, the command of the 7th Massachusetts changed rapidly. Couch was promoted to the command of their brigade whereupon Nelson H. Davis took command of the regiment. Davis was soon transferred to the inspector general's department. Col. Joseph Wheelock of Boston briefly held command but resigned in January 1862. At that time, Captain David Allen Russell, of the Regular army was promoted to the colonelcy of the 7th Massachusetts. He would lead the regiment through many major battles and retained command until February 1863.

== Peninsular Campaign ==
Leaving Fort Stevens on March 11, 1862, the 7th Massachusetts was assigned to the Army of the Potomac and was shipped via Washington to Fortress Monroe. Here, Union forces under the command of Major General George B. McClellan gathered in preparation for an advance on the Confederate capital of Richmond via the Virginia Peninsula. The regiment saw its first combat during the Battle of Williamsburg and suffered light casualties of one killed and one wounded.

During the Peninsular Campaign, the regiment took part in the Battle of Fair Oaks and the Battle of Oak Grove taking light casualties. After the failure of the Peninsular Campaign, the 7th Massachusetts withdrew with the rest of the Army of the Potomac to Fortress Monroe. On August 31, they were shipped to northern Virginia.

== Medal of Honor recipient ==
- Corporal Lowell M. Maxham

== See also ==
- Massachusetts in the Civil War
- List of Massachusetts Civil War units
