= National Army Museum (New Zealand) =

Military museum in Waiouru, New Zealand

Coordinates: 39.4804°S 175.6691°E

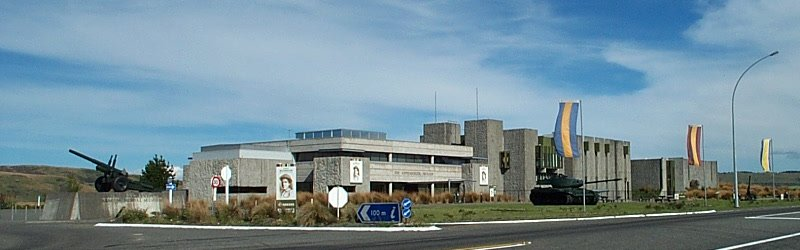
National Army Museum

The National Army Museum (Māori: Te Mata Toa) is the museum of the New Zealand Army. It was formerly known as the Queen Elizabeth II Army Memorial Museum. It is located on State Highway One, on the southern side of the small military town of Waiouru. The 1300 square metre museum is fortress-looking in design, complete with a bridge and moat. It took the 2nd Field Squadron of the Royal New Zealand Engineers (RNZE) 276 days to build, and was opened in October 1978.

According to the museum's literature, it functions as a memorial to those who have fallen, to those who have served and are still serving, and to the battles fought by New Zealand soldiers. It is also a research, teaching and training facility of New Zealand's military history. Associated literature reveals "the museum serves as a place of connection between visitors and the nation's military past, a place where people can engage with real life stories and experiences and discover how these conflicts have shaped the nation".

The museum offers a number of facilities and experiences which include a gift shop, the Home Fires Café, the Kippenberger Research Library, and the Tears on Greenstone Memorial. On display are many and varied collections, including weapons, war memorabilia, military vehicles, exhibitions of battles (which mark anniversaries important in New Zealand's military history), a huge medal collection exhibiting medals associated with New Zealand and its army, and lifelike displays of twelve of the biggest campaigns that New Zealand troops have been involved in. "Kidz headquarters" provides children with fun learning activities.

== Tears on Greenstone ==
The Tears on Greenstone or Roimata Pounamu is a large wall made of greenstone. It serves as a memorial for the 30,000 plus service men and women who have sacrificed their lives for their country. The water cascading down the southern hemisphere's largest greenstone structure represents the tears of endless mourning, and is accompanied by an audio system reciting the names of the fallen. There is a touch screen near the Memorial where visitors can search for names of people lost in battle and hear those names read aloud.

== Kippenberger Research Library ==
The Kippenberger Research Library houses a number of collections relating to New Zealand's military history. The library, which is open to the public and free of charge, is named after Major General Sir Howard Karl Kippenberger, a military leader and historian who served in both World Wars. His extensive study of past campaigns aided his ability to command New Zealand troops in many great battles. A large military library owned by Major General Kippenberger was purchased by the New Zealand Army in 1958 and is now housed within the Kippenberger Research Library itself. The library was opened on 24 March 1995 by Kippenberger's daughter, Mary Weston.

== Medals ==
On display within the museum is a large collection of medals associated with the army. These include medals donated, loaned and others acquired from the families of those who served overseas. The museum offers five permanent displays including: British Campaign and General Service Medals; Campaign and General Service Medals awarded to New Zealanders; United Nations and Commemorative Medals; Foreign Medals and Meritorious Service, Long Service, Efficient Service Decorations and Medals Orders, Decorations and Medals. They also have temporary displays which are changed regularly to display different family donated medals.

=== Medal theft ===
The museum had a number of Victoria Crosses on display in the Valour Alcove of the Lower Gallery. On 2 December 2007, 96 medals were stolen from locked, reinforced glass cabinets in the museum. On 16 February 2008, New Zealand Police announced that all of the medals had been recovered as a result of a NZ$300,000 reward offered by British medal collector Lord Michael Ashcroft and Nelson businessman Tom Sturgess, a former United States Marine.

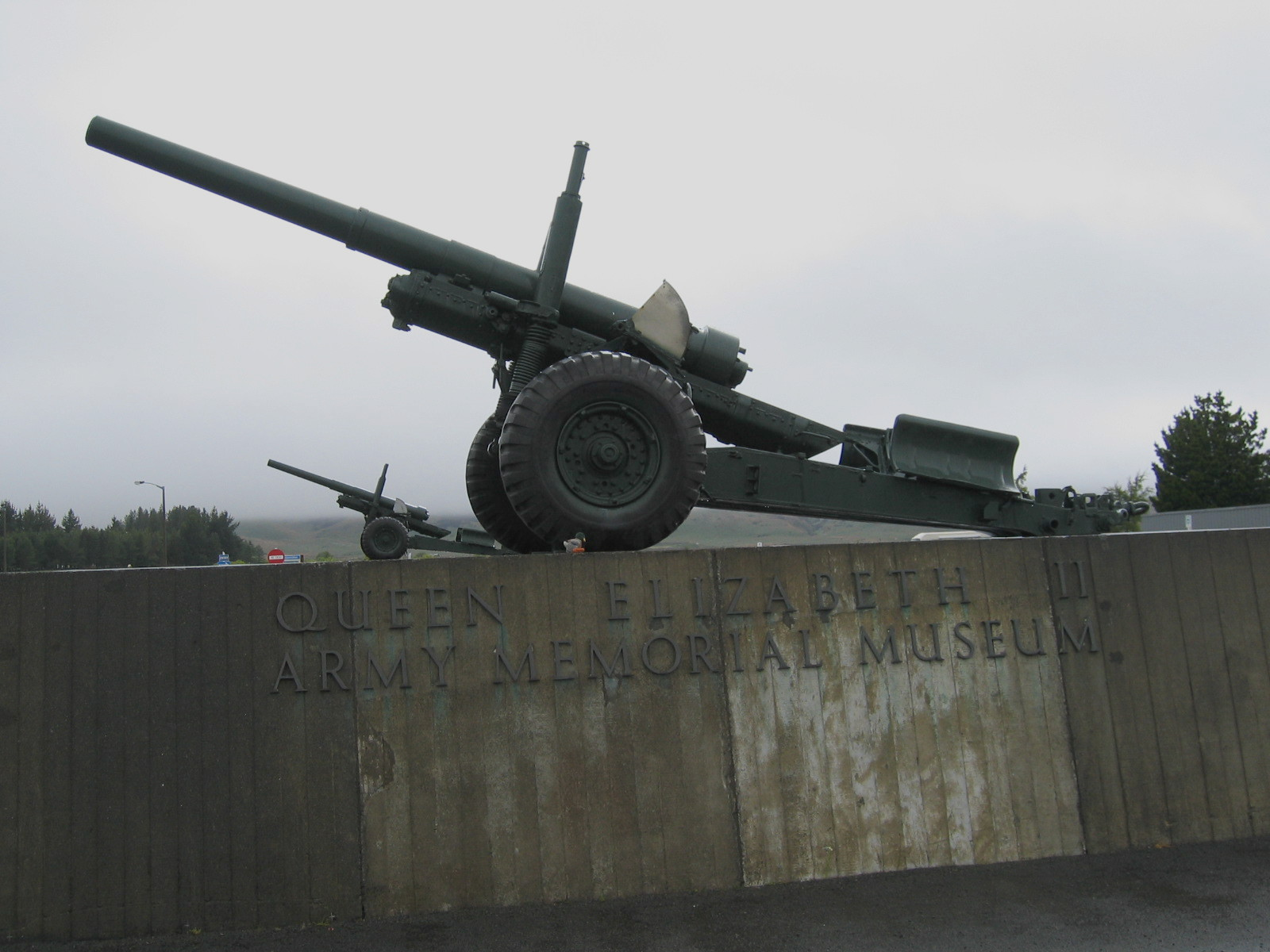
BL 5.5 inch Medium Guns at the entrance to the museum

The medals stolen included nine Victoria Crosses: Brig Leslie Andrew, 1917; Sgt Keith Elliott, 1942; Capt Samuel Frickleton, 1917; (in addition to his Distinguished Conduct Medal and Military Medal) Sgt John Gildroy Grant, 1918; Sgt John Daniel Hinton, 1941; Sgt Alfred Hulme, 1941; Maj Reginald Stanley Judson, 1918; Lt Col Harry John Laurent, 1918; and Capt Charles Upham, 1941–42 (both the VC and bar). Also stolen were two George Crosses: David Russell; Ken Hudson; and an Albert Medal: Randolph Ridling.

It appears that the museum was previously holding 13 VCs, of which 2, those of Charles Upham and Percy Valentine Storkey, were on loan. There were four VCs not taken: Thomas Cooke, 1916; Bernard Diamond, 1857; William James Hardham, 1901; and Percy Valentine Storkey, 1918.

== See also ==
- Medal theft
