= Randolph Ridling =

New Zealand soldier

- Born: Randolph Gordon Ridling; 17 March 1888; Auckland, New Zealand
- Died: 13 January 1975 (aged 86); Wellington, New Zealand
- Military career
- Allegiance: New Zealand
- Branch: New Zealand Military Forces
- Service years: 1915–1919
- Rank: Captain
- Unit: New Zealand Rifle Brigade (Earl of Liverpool's Own)
- Conflicts: First World War; Western Front
- Awards: Albert Medal
- Other work: Educationist

Randolph Gordon Ridling, GC (17 March 1888 – 13 January 1975) was a New Zealand soldier who served during the First World War on the Western Front with the New Zealand Expeditionary Force. He was awarded the Albert Medal in 1919 for saving the life of a soldier during a grenade training exercise the previous year. After the war, he studied at the University of Cambridge and subsequently worked in the education sector in New Zealand. In 1971, the Albert Medal was disestablished by royal warrant as a gallantry award and living recipients were required to swap their medals for the George Cross. Ridling, for sentimental reasons, sought an exemption from Queen Elizabeth II to retain his medal, which was granted. He died in 1975, aged 86.

== Early life ==
Randolph Gordon Ridling was born on 17 March 1888 in Auckland, New Zealand, to Andrew Ridling and his wife Ellen née Gray. Educated at Auckland Grammar School, he went on to Auckland University College for a year of tertiary study before he became a teacher. In May 1915 he married Henrietta née Cormack at St Stephen's Church in Ponsonby. However, his wife soon became ill and died three months after their wedding.

== First World War ==
On 14 December 1915, Ridling enlisted in the New Zealand Expeditionary Force (NZEF) for service in the First World War. Within days he was promoted to corporal and by late February 1916 had received a further promotion to sergeant major. He was commissioned as a second lieutenant in May and was sent to the 18th Reinforcements, a draft of personnel destined for service on the Western Front in France. Departing New Zealand in October, he was at the NZEF base in England by the end of the year and was posted to the New Zealand Rifle Brigade (NZRB).

Ridling arrived on the Western Front on 17 February 1917 as a platoon commander in the 4th Battalion of the NZRB. His period in command was brief, for on 23 February he was wounded. He was medically evacuated to England for treatment, initially in London and then at the New Zealand General Hospital in Brockenhurst. Discharged in June he underwent a convalescence period in Brighton before proceeding to the NZRB troop depot at Sling Camp in Bulford. However, he was still troubled by his wounds and required further hospital treatment.

By early 1918, Ridling had returned to duty, being posted to Brocton Camp as an instructor. Promoted to lieutenant in March, he was tasked with teaching bombing techniques to reinforcement troops destined for service on the Western Front. On 19 April, he was instructing in the use of the Mills bomb. A number of men had already successfully thrown live bombs from a bombing bay. Then a nervous trainee fumbled a bomb after removing the pin and, panicking, dived into a corner of the bay. Ridling, also in the bay, grabbed the man and pulled him to shelter. He got the man clear but was injured when the grenade exploded. His wound was to his groin and he required hospital treatment. He was back at Brocton Camp by 8 May and was soon made assistant adjutant to the 5th Reserve Battalion of the NZRB.

== Postwar period ==
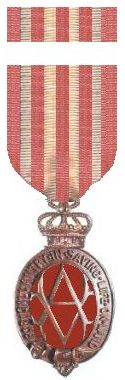
An example of an Albert Medal

As the NZEF demobilised after the end of the war, Ridling, promoted to temporary captain on 10 March 1919, was appointed an education officer. In this role he lectured troops in the NZEF Education Scheme. In late March, his name was published as being brought to the attention of the Secretary of State for services in connection with the war. He himself was discharged from the NZEF in September, having reverted to his substantive rank of lieutenant. For his actions of 19 April 1918, the commander of NZEF forces in England, Brigadier General George Richardson, had recommended Ridling for the Albert Medal for Lifesaving (AM). The AM, named for Prince Albert, had been established in 1866 by Queen Victoria to recognise gallantry in saving life at sea. In subsequent years, the requirement that the act of gallantry be performed at sea was dispensed with so that deeds performed on land could also be recognised with the AM. Ridling's award was announced in The London Gazette on 9 December 1919. The citation read:

The King has been pleased to award the Albert Medal to Lieutenant Randolph Gordon Ridling, New Zealand Rifle Brigade, in recognition of his gallantry in saving life in April of last year. At Brocton Camp, Stafford, on the 19th April, 1918, a recruit who was under instruction in bombing dropped a live Mills' grenade in the throwing bay after pulling out the pin. Lacking the presence of mind to attempt to escape, he kicked the bomb towards the entrance and retreated to the inner end of the bay. Lieutenant Ridling, the Bombing Officer, seeing the man's danger, went to his rescue. Seizing him in his arms, he started to carry him out, but the bomb exploded before he could get clear of the bay, and he was wounded severely in the groin. But for Lieutenant Ridling's coolness and bravery the man, who was only slightly wounded, would, in all probability, have lost his life.

— London Gazette, No. 31678, 9 December 1919

At the time of the announcement, Ridling was studying at Queens' College, Cambridge; he had been awarded a scholarship available for soldiers of the NZEF. He graduated with a Bachelor of Arts in 1921 but continued to study, gaining a Diploma of Agriculture the following year. During this time, he met Patricia née Shaw and the couple were married in London. They had a daughter.

== Later life ==
Returning to New Zealand in 1923, Ridling worked for the Taranaki Education Board. Seven years later, he became an inspector, monitoring the Education Department's various manual and technical schools. By this time he had earned a Master of Arts degree from the University of Cambridge, in absentia. In July 1931, he was appointed principal of the Wellington Technical College. He went on to write a number of papers relating to education in the technical and agricultural fields. He was also an advocate for education by correspondence.

In 1948, Ridling was a member of a committee formed to report to the New Zealand government on the recruitment, education and training of teachers, which completed its work in 1951. During this time he led the New Zealand delegation to the General Conference of the United Nations Educational, Scientific and Cultural Organization. Retiring in September 1950, in his later years he lived in Raglan, on the west coast of the North Island of New Zealand.

The AM was disestablished by Royal Warrant as a gallantry award in 1971. Public recognition of the award had declined in recent years and it was deemed that this deprived AM recipients of the recognition that their deeds had earned. Living recipients were required to exchange them for the George Cross (GC), which had existed since 1940 and was superior in status to the AM. As well as swapping their AM for the GC, the recipients would be entitled to use the GC postnominal. However, Ridling sought an exemption from Queen Elizabeth II, citing his high sentimental attachment to the award. His request was granted and he was allowed to retain his AM while still being entitled to be treated as a holder of the GC. In subsequent years he attended reunions of the Victoria Cross and George Cross Association. He died on 13 January 1975 in Wellington, his wife having predeceased him by several years. His remains were cremated and interred at Karori Cemetery.

== Medal ==
In 1982, Ridling's daughter donated his medals, which in addition to the AM, included the British War Medal, the Victory Medal, the 1935 Jubilee Medal and the 1937 Coronation Medal, to the National Army Museum in Waiouru, where they are displayed in its Medal Repository.
