= Lowell M. Maxham =

American Civil War Medal of Honor recipient

Lowell Mason Maxham
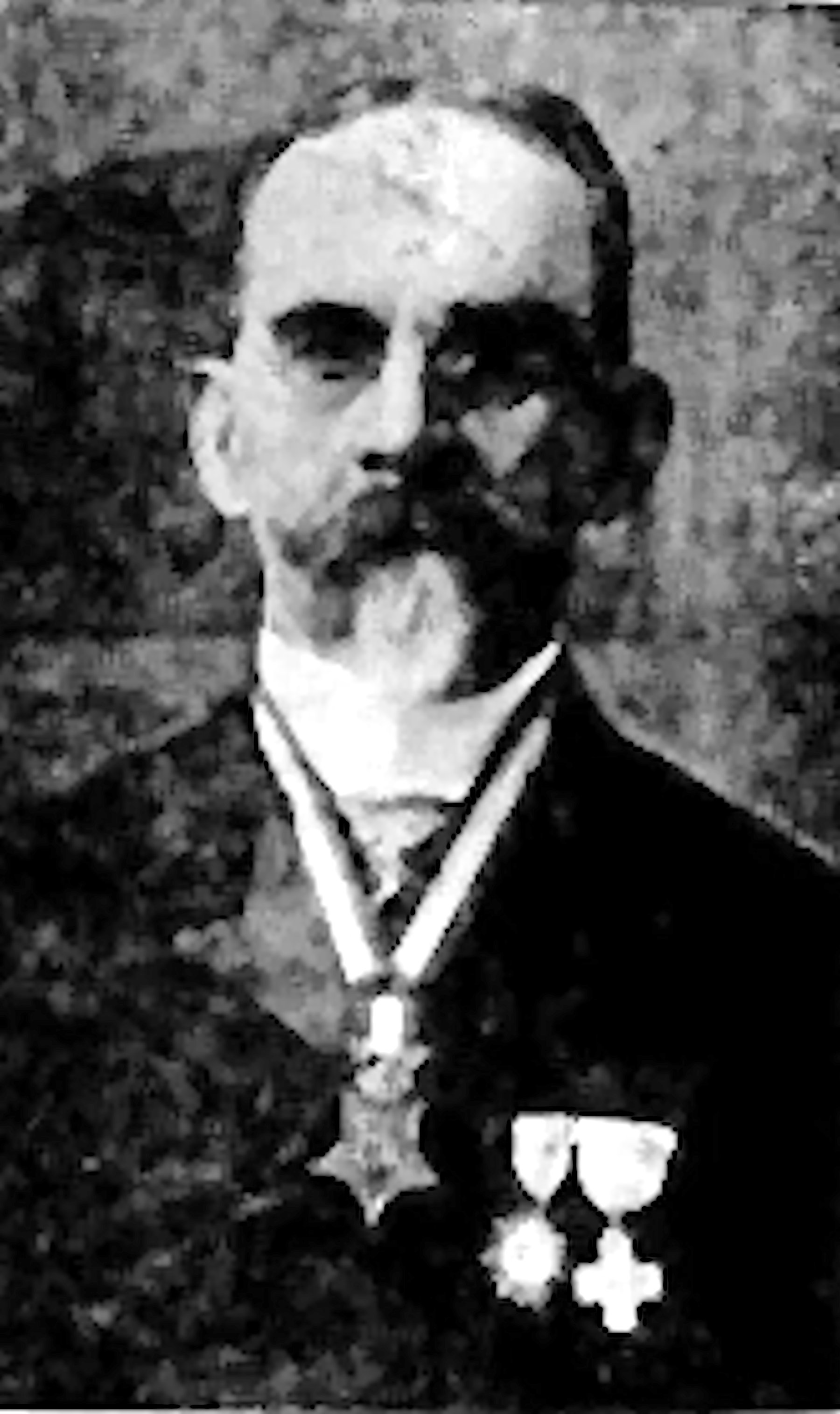
- Maxham in 1905
- Born: December 6, 1841; Carver, Massachusetts
- Died: February 13, 1931 (aged 89); Boston, Massachusetts
- Burial place: Mayflower Hill Cemetery Taunton, Massachusetts
- Spouse: Annette A. King (m. 1866)
- Military career
- Allegiance: United States of America; Union
- Branch: United States Army; Union Army
- Rank: Private
- Units: Company F, 7th Massachusetts Volunteer Infantry
- Conflicts: American Civil War
- Awards: Medal of Honor

Lowell Mason Maxham (1841–1931) was a recipient of the Medal of Honor for heroism during the American Civil War.

== Biography ==
Lowell Mason Maxham was born on December 6, 1841, in Carver, Massachusetts. During the Civil War, he joined the Union Army at Taunton, Massachusetts and was a corporal in Company F, of the 7th Regiment Massachusetts Volunteer Infantry. He was awarded the Medal of Honor for heroism at the Second Battle of Fredericksburg on May 3, 1863, during VI Corps' seizure of Marye's Heights during the Chancellorsville Campaign. Maxham carried the regiment's colors and despite severe wounds planted them in the rebels' works.

He is one of eight recipients of the Medal of Honor to be a member of the Ancient and Honorable Artillery Company of Massachusetts. On August 24, 1896, he received his Medal of Honor alongside his two regimental comrades, James Holehouse and James H. Luther.

He married Annette A. King of Raynham (1845-1899) on January 1, 1866.

After the war, he became an inventor, patenting designs for an automobile bumper and a third rail for trolley cars.

Maxham died on February 13, 1931. He is buried in the Mayflower Hill Cemetery in Taunton.

== Medal of Honor citation ==
Though severely wounded and in face of a deadly fire from the enemy at short range, he rushed bravely forward and was among the first to enter the enemy's works on the crest of Marye's Heights and helped to plant his regimental colors there.

== Legacy ==
Lowell M. Maxham Elementary School in Taunton, Massachusetts is named after him.
