= Nelson H. Davis =

United States Army general (1821–1890)

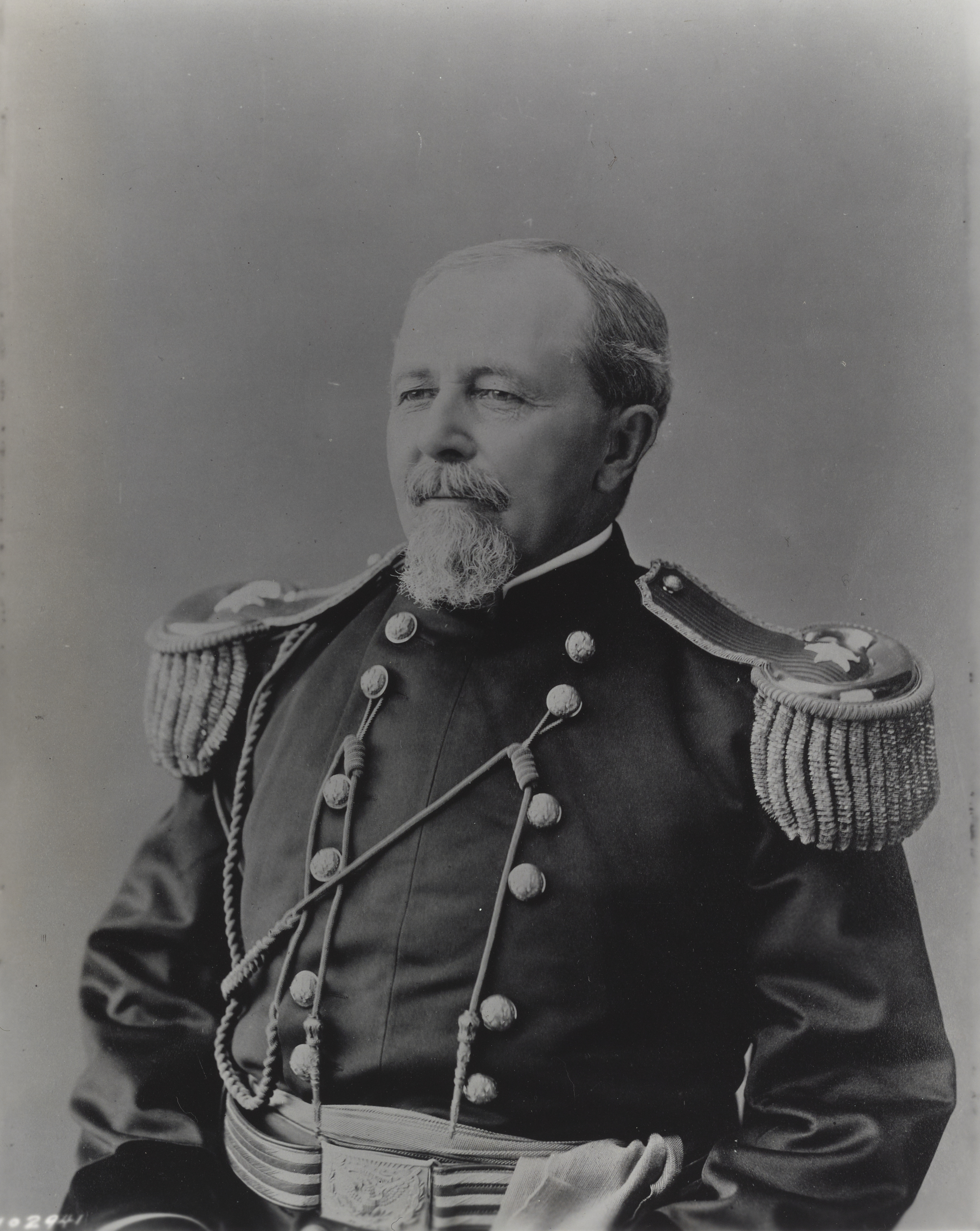
- Davis as Inspector General of the United States Army c. 1885
- Born: September 20, 1821; Oxford, Massachusetts
- Died: May 15, 1890 (aged 68); Governor's Island, New York
- Burial place: South Cemetery, Oxford, Massachusetts
- Military career
- Allegiance: United States of America; Union
- Branch: United States Army; Union Army
- Service years: 1846–1885
- Rank: Brigadier General
- Commands: 7th Massachusetts Infantry Regiment; Asst. Inspector General, Army of the Potomac; Inspector General of the U.S. Army
- Conflicts: Mexican-American War; American Indian Wars; American Civil War

Nelson Henry Davis (September 20, 1821 – May 15, 1890) was a general in the United States Army; serving in the Mexican–American War, the American Civil War and in actions against the Apache people in New Mexico.

Davis graduated from the United States Military Academy at West Point in 1846 and served as an infantry officer in the Mexican-American War. When the civil war began then-Captain Davis fought at the First Battle of Manassas. He became colonel of the 7th Massachusetts Infantry Regiment but after a few months he was transferred as a major to a staff position within the Army of the Potomac. In this capacity, he caught the attention of Maj. Gen. George B. McClellan, who eventually assigned Davis to duty with his headquarters staff. On July 10, 1868, President Andrew Johnson nominated Davis for the award of the honorary grade of brevet brigadier general in the Regular Army, to rank from March 13, 1865, for meritorious and efficient services during the war. The U.S. Senate confirmed the brevet on July 28, 1868.

After the war Davis continued his military service and eventually became Inspector General of the U.S. Army in 1885. He retired in the same year with the rank of brigadier general. He died at Governor's Island, New York, on May 15, 1890.

== See also ==
- List of American Civil War brevet generals (Union)
- Massachusetts in the American Civil War
