= Medal theft =

Medal theft is the theft of awards for military action, civil service, and achievements in science or sports. Medals and similar awards are stolen for resale, private collection or ransom; some are destroyed for gold bullion. While not common in developed nations, reported instances have drawn wide press coverage, considering notability and public exposure of the victims of the crime.

== By nation ==
=== Australia ===
In 1985, Olympic medals belonging to Australian swimmer John Konrads were stolen from his home. The medals were recovered in 2009.

In 2003, Lauren Burns' Olympic gold medal was stolen.

=== Canada ===
In December 1979, a medal awarded to Milton Fowler Gregg in 1918, the Victoria Cross, was donated to the Royal Canadian Regiment Museum in London, Ontario, but was stolen from the museum shortly afterwards.

On January 15, 2009, about 30 valuable medals belonging to a Odd Fellows lodge in Chilliwack, British Columbia were stolen. Five of the medals later turned up during a narcotics raid.

=== India ===
In 2004, Rabindranath Tagore's 1913 Nobel Prize medal was stolen. In 2016, a local singer accused of sheltering the thieves was arrested, but the medal could not be recovered. Interrogation revealed that an Indian national, along with two Europeans, were involved in the theft. The Swedish government later presented two replicas, one in gold and one in silver, to Viswa Bharati University.

In February 2017, Kailash Satyarthi's 2014 Nobel Prize medal was stolen.

=== Russian Empire, Soviet Union, Russia, Belarus and Ukraine ===
Peacetime theft of medals prior to 1980s was quite rare. A well-known case occurred on the day of the Decembrist revolt, December 14, 1825. Military governor of Saint Petersburg, Count Miloradovich, was fatally wounded by Pyotr Kakhovsky. The dying Miloradovich was taken to a safe place; when a surgeon arrived there, Miloradovich laid stripped of his military decorations. The marauders remained unidentified.

A black market in Soviet military artifacts boomed in 1980s. The first publicly known case occurred in 1983: Gennady and Inna Kalinin murdered retired admiral Georgy Kholostyakov and his wife were at their home with the sole purpose of obtaining the admiral's medals (which included the Golden Star and Order of the Bath). The prosecution, allegedly supervised by Yuri Andropov, connected Kalinins to another murder and 38 other cases of medal theft. Gennady Kalinin was sentenced to death, Inna Kalinina to 15 years. Violent robberies against veterans remain quite rare: in most cases, the thieves impersonate social workers, police, or museum workers and thus obtain access to old veterans' homes without violence.

A massive theft from the Central Armed Forces Museum identified in 1994 remains unsolved. In November 2006, Russian government agency requested Sotheby's to halt an upcoming sale of 11 Soviet military awards presumed to be stolen. The medals were later returned to Russia through Interpol. The Central Armed Forces Museum admitted that the medals could have been stolen from them.

On December 23, 1999, thieves stole the collection of Michel da Vincha, a French citizen and notable collector living in Moscow, which included rare awards of the Russian Empire. Although the police soon recovered the stolen treasures, as of April 2007 they were still not returned to Da Vincha.

According to Trud, there were two surges in medal thefts in 2000s. The latest one occurred in the first half of 2008, continues as of August 2008 and has not been analyzed completely yet. Victims range from World War II heroes like Yekaterina Demina, the only female Marine of that war, to symphony conductor Veronica Dudarova. A concurrent crime wave was reported in Minsk and Vitebsk, Belarus. The previous crime wave peaked between 2003 and 2006; most public cases include:

- In 2004 Moscow prosecution detained Yury Tikhonov who faced indictment for multiple counts of medal theft, including robbing fighter ace Anton Yakimenko. The alleged thief visited war veterans in Russia and Belarus disguised as a photographer, and quietly replaced their genuine medals with fakes. Prosecution asserted that a large number of similar crimes remained unknown to the victims due to the quality of counterfeit medals. In 2006, a 30-year-old psychology student, also using photography and counterfeit replicas, repeated Tikhonov's modus operandi in Ukraine. The unidentified thief was caught in Rivne Oblast and indicted in 15 counts of theft.
- An Order of the British Empire was stolen from its owner, educator Elena Nemirovskaya, in July 2004. Nemirovskaya, Teodor Shanin and Mstislav Rostropovich were the three living Russian recipients of OBE, and Nemirovskaya's award was the only one physically present in Russia.
- In 2005, Moscow prosecution indicted Alexander Karmanov in multiple cases of fraud. According to the prosecution, in 1993 Karmanov, a seasoned convict who already served a total of 17 years in prison, organized a properly licensed military "museum" to circumvent the law prohibiting trading in state awards. Karmanov, presenting himself as a legitimate museum worker, fraudulently obtained awards issued to late Ivan Kozhedub, Sergey Gorshkov and other military figures.
- In the middle of 2006, two men robbed the family of the late Hero of the Soviet Union WWII bomber pilot Yegor Chalov (1919–1983) in Novgorod. On September 10, 2007, Hero of the Soviet Union former intelligence officer Nikolay Kuznetsov, also from Novgorod Oblast, was robbed of his medals. Both cases appear to be connected by a common sales channel. Perpetrators in the Yegor Chalov case were apprehended and eventually sentenced to 4 years each; the stolen medals are presumed gone without trace. Medals stolen from Kuznetsov were recovered through Moscow journalists, apparently in the course of the same operation.

=== United Kingdom ===
The most famous stolen military medal in the United Kingdom is the Chelengk awarded by the Ottoman Empire to Lord Nelson. It was stolen from the National Maritime Museum in 1951 and has never been recovered.

In 1985, Kay Miller's Nobel medal for 'International Physicians for the Prevention of Nuclear War' was stolen and recovered.

In 2000, a gold medal was stolen from Matthew Pinsent, British rowing champion, at Heathrow.

In 2006, more than £23,000 (US$45,970) worth of football medals stolen from the home of then Liverpool F.C. goalkeeper Jerzy Dudek were found in the possession of businessman Martin Roche.

On February 6, 2008, several medals from World War I were stolen from a home in Knoll Hill, Aldington, Kent.

In October 2012 the Olympic medals of Hannah Macleod and Alex Partridge were stolen at the Mahiki nightclub. Macleod's medal was returned in the mail, but Partridge's medal is still missing.

The Nobel Peace Prize medal won by one of the founding fathers of the modern Labour Party, Arthur Henderson, has been stolen in a £150,000 raid at the Lord Mayor's office in Newcastle on April 3, 2013.

=== United States ===
A large collection of medals, trophies and lithographs were stolen from the International Swimming Hall of Fame in 2004. The bulk of the collection was sold off on eBay by the thief. Most of the items were returned in 2005 after the museum discovered the theft. The 1912 Olympic wreath and gold medal of Belle Moore are still at large.

In 2007, the 1939 Nobel Prize medal in physics, awarded to professor Ernest Lawrence, was stolen but recovered.

=== New Zealand ===
December 2, 2007, thieves stole 11 war medals from the QEII Army Memorial Museum in New Zealand. Stolen medals were recovered in February 2008 after paying the bounty, reportedly to the thieves themselves. Three unidentified persons appeared in courts as suspects.
