= David Russell (Gaelic footballer) =

Irish Gaelic footballer

Personal information
- Born: County Clare, Ireland

Sport
- Sport: Gaelic football
- Position: Full Forward
Club
- Years: Club
- St Senan's Kilkee
Club titles
- Clare titles: 2
Inter-county
- Years: County
- 1999-: Clare
Inter-county titles
- All Stars: 0

David Russell is a Gaelic footballer from Kilnaboy County Clare. He has been a member of the Clare county team since 2000 and has played in two Munster Senior finals in 2000 and 2012. In 2004 he helped Clare to win the Tommy Murphy Cup. He has also won a number of McGrath Cup titles.

At club level he plays with St Senan's, Kilkee and won Clare Senior Football Championship titles in 2003 and 2005, playing in Munster Senior Club Football Championship finals after both wins but losing out to Kerry side An Gaeltacht in 2003 and Cork side Nemo Rangers.
