= David Russell (cricketer, born 1936) =

English cricketer

Personal information
- Full name: David Francis Russell
- Born: 29 October 1936 (age 90); Hackney, London, England
- Batting: Right-handed
- Bowling: Right-arm off break

Domestic team information
- Years: Team
- 1959: Oxford University

Career statistics
Competition	First-class
Matches	5
Runs scored	57
Batting average	14.25
100s/50s	–/–
Top score	22
Balls bowled	699
Wickets	11
Bowling average	31.27
5 wickets in innings	–
10 wickets in match	–
Best bowling	3/53
Catches/stumpings	3/–
- Source: Cricinfo, 22 June 2020

David Francis Russell (born 29 October 1936) is an English former first-class cricketer.

Russell was born at Hackney in October 1936. He later studied at St Peter's Hall at the University of Oxford. While studying at Oxford, Russell made five appearances in first-class cricket for Oxford University in 1959, a tally which included a match against the touring Indians. He scored 57 runs in his five matches with a high score of 22, while with his off break bowling he took 11 wickets at an average of 31.27 and best figures of 3 for 53.
