= David F. O. Russell =

British Businessman

David F. O. Russell CBE MC FRSE
- Born: 9 September 1915; Glenrothes, Scotland, United Kingdom
- Died: 3 January 1993 (aged 77); Fife, Scotland
- Occupation: Businessman

Major David Francis Oliphant Russell CBE MC FRSE (1915 – 1993) was a British businessman and philanthropist.

== Early life and military service ==
He was born at Rothes House (near Glenrothes) on 9 September 1915, the son of Sir David Russell and his wife, Alison Blyth. He was educated privately at Sedbergh School in Yorkshire. He then took a general Arts degree at St Andrews University, graduating MA.

In the Second World War he was commissioned as an officer in the 7th battalion Black Watch and was severely wounded at the Battle of El Alamein. He won the Military Cross for his actions. Further wounded twice, at both Sicily as part of the invasion of Sicily and Italy and again at Le Havre as part of the D-Day landings, he was invalided out of the army in 1944.

== Career ==
In 1956 he succeeded his father as Chairman of Tullis Russell & Co Ltd, paper-makers in Fife. From 1963 he began taking on various senior administrative roles at St Andrews University.

== Recognition ==
In 1969 he was created a Commander of the Order of the British Empire for his services to business, to university and to the National Trust. Heriot-Watt University gave him an honorary doctorate (DSc) in 1973 and St Andrews University gave hime a second honorary doctorate (LLD) in 1977.

In 1974 he was elected a Fellow of the Royal Society of Edinburgh. His proposers were Thomas Malcolm Knox, Alick Buchanan-Smith, Baron Balerno, Robert Allan Smith and Anthony Elliot Ritchie. He served as the Society's Vice President from 1943 to 1946.

== Death ==
He died at Rossie House in Fife on 3 January 1993.
