= David Russell (businessman) =

Scottish businessperson (1872–1956)

Sir David Russell FRSE FLS FSA LLD (1872–1956) was a Scottish paper manufacturer and philanthropist, remembered as an amateur botanist, photographer and antiquary. His donation of 18,000 photographs to the University of St Andrews forms the core of what is known as the David Russell Collection. He created and oversaw multiple charitable trusts including the David Russell Trust.

== Life ==
He was born at Silverburn House near Markinch in Fife in 1872, the third son of David Russell (1831-1906). His great grandfather, Thomas Russell, had founded a paper factory in 1809 and acquired Rothes Mill (giving its name to Glenrothes) in 1836. He was educated at Clifton Bank School in St Andrews. He then studied Science at Edinburgh University.

From 1890 onwards Sir David developed a strong interest in photography.

In 1906 David Russell, following his father's death, merged his company, Thomas Russell and Co. Ltd. to create Tullis Russell one of Scotland's largest paper manufacturers. From 1912 to 1914 he organised construction of a major power plant, greatly increasing company production, also moving the main mill to Rothes Mill (now in Glenrothes. In 1925 Russell bought out the Tullis family interest in the company but retained the company name as sole partner. In the 1930s he expanded the company interests to a range of international activities, ranging from tea-growing in Assam to the funding of archaeological investigations in Istanbul.

He had been given an honorary doctorate (LLD) by St Andrews University in 1922. In 1929 he began publishing the "Rothmill Quarterly Magazine".

In 1930 he was elected a Fellow of the Royal Society of Edinburgh. His proposers were Sir James Irvine, William Carmichael McIntosh, D'Arcy Wentworth Thompson and James Watt. He served as the Society's Vice President from 1943 to 1946. He was knighted by King George VI in 1946.

He died at Silverburn House, the same house where he was born, on 12 May 1956. He is buried in the churchyard of Upper Largo.

Sir David's biography was written by Lorn Macintyre in 1994.

== Family ==
In 1912 he married Alison Blyth, daughter of Francis Blyth of Belvedere in Kent. Their five children included David Francis Oliphant Russell.
