= David Russell (GC) =

Recipient of the George Cross

David Russell GC
- Born: 30 March 1911; Ayr, Scotland
- Died: February 1945 (aged 33); Italy
- Cause of death: Executed by German military firing squad
- Burial place: Udine Commonwealth War Graves Cemetery; 46.11636°N 13.22536°E
- Occupation: Lance Corporal in the New Zealand Army
- Known for: Escaping from a POW camp and being awarded the George Cross

David Russell GC (30 March 1911 – February 1945) was a lance corporal with the 22nd (Motor) Battalion, New Zealand Infantry, 2nd NZEF, who was awarded the George Cross posthumously after being executed by German forces in Italy.

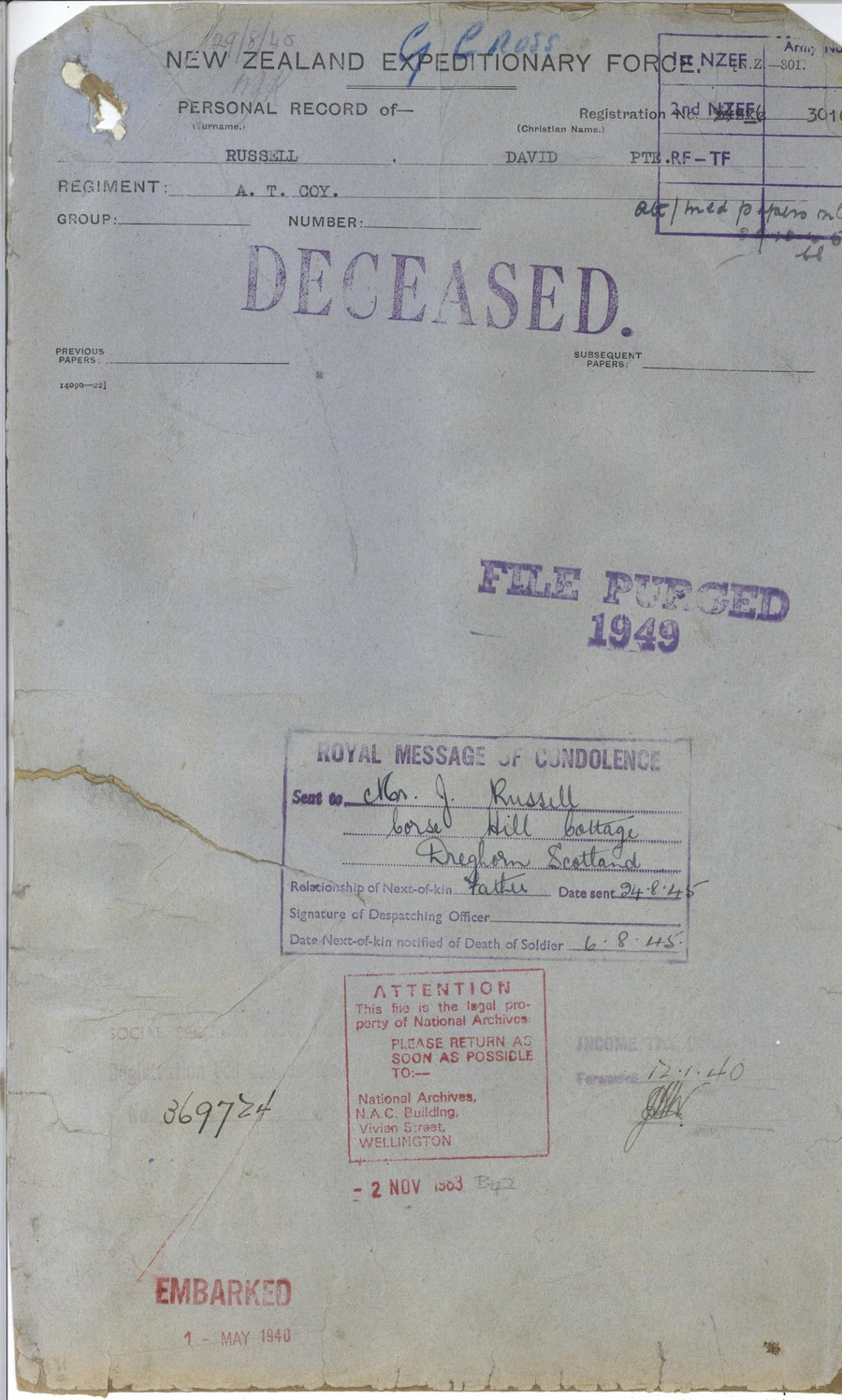
David Russell, cover of WWII Personnel File

Russell was born in Ayr, Scotland, son of James and Jessie Russell, of Corsehill, Ayrshire, but the family emigrated to New Zealand. He worked as an orderly at Napier Hospital in Hawke's Bay before enlisting in the New Zealand Army in September 1939.

He was captured at Reweisat Ridge in Egypt in 1942 and taken to a POW camp in Italy. He escaped and helped Italians who were assisting other Allied POWs to escape. He was particularly active in the Ponte di Piave township and district between 22 and 28 February 1945 but was recaptured.

Russell refused to name the Italians he had assisted, and was shot by firing squad. A German officer who witnessed the execution said he died very bravely.

His George Cross is displayed at the QEII Army Memorial Museum, Waiouru, New Zealand. On Sunday 2 December 2007, it was among a dozen medals stolen from the museum. On 16 February 2008 New Zealand Police announced all the medals had been recovered as a result of a NZ$300,000 reward offered by Michael Ashcroft and Tom Sturgess.
