= David Allen Russell =

US Army officer (1820–1864)

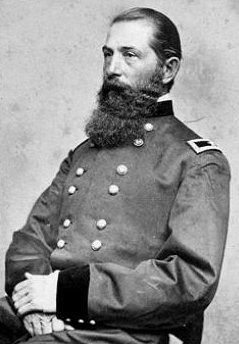
- Born: December 10, 1820; Salem, New York
- Died: September 19, 1864 (aged 43); Winchester, Virginia
- Burial place: Evergreen Cemetery, Salem, New York
- Military career
- Allegiance: United States of America; Union
- Branch: United States Army; Union Army
- Service years: 1845–1864
- Rank: Brigadier General; Brevet Major General
- Commands: 7th Regiment Massachusetts Volunteer Infantry
- Conflicts: Mexican–American War: Battle of Paso Ovejas; Battle of Cerro Gordo; Indian Wars: Rogue River War; Yakima War; American Civil War: Peninsula Campaign; Seven Days Battles; Battle of Antietam; Battle of Fredericksburg; Overland Campaign; Third Battle of Winchester †

David Allen Russell (December 10, 1820 – September 19, 1864) was a career United States Army officer who served in the Mexican–American War and the American Civil War. He was killed in action as a brigadier general in the Union Army.

== Early life ==
Russell was born in Salem, New York, the son of David Abel Russell, who was a member of the House of Representatives from 1835 to 1841, and his wife. During his final year in Congress, the senior Russell secured an appointment to the United States Military Academy for his son. The junior Russell graduated near the bottom of his class in 1845. His first assignment was with the U.S. 1st Infantry Regiment.

He transferred to the U.S. 4th Infantry Regiment where he served in Mexico. He was brevetted for gallantry and meritorious service at the Battle of Paso Ovejas and the Battle of Cerro Gordo. He was promoted to first lieutenant in 1848.

After the war, the 4th Infantry was sent to the Pacific Northwest. Russell fought in the Rogue River War and the Yakima War against local Native American tribes. He was promoted to captain in 1854.

== Civil War ==
In 1861, the 4th Infantry was recalled to the East and placed in the defenses around Washington, D.C. Russell joined the volunteer army and accepted a commission as colonel of the 7th Regiment Massachusetts Volunteer Infantry. Russell then served in the Peninsula Campaign and the Seven Days Battles. He was brevetted lieutenant colonel in the regular army for gallant and meritorious service.

In 1862, Russell was promoted to major in the regular army and assigned to the U.S. 8th Infantry Regiment. Still in command of the 7th Massachusetts, he fought in the Battle of Antietam. Later in 1862, Russell was promoted to brigadier general of volunteers and commanded a brigade during the Rappahannock campaign. He later fought at the Battle of Fredericksburg. Russell was primarily in reserve during the Battle of Gettysburg, but was brevetted colonel in the regular army shortly afterward.

In 1864, Russell fought in the Overland Campaign. He was mortally wounded later that year in the Shenandoah Valley during the Battle of Opequon, otherwise known as the Third Battle of Winchester, when he was struck by a shell fragment. On May 3, 1867, President Andrew Johnson nominated Russell for the grade of brevet major general in the regular army, to rank from the date of his death in the field, September 19, 1864, and the United States Senate confirmed the appointment on February 14, 1868.

He is buried in Salem, New York, in Evergreen Cemetery.

== In memoriam ==
Fort D. A. Russell in the Wyoming Territory, established in 1867, was named in Russell's honor; this post was renamed for Governor and U. S. Senator Francis E. Warren in 1930. Afterwards, Camp Marfa, established in 1911 near Marfa, Texas, became Fort D. A. Russell. This post was closed in 1945, during demobilization after World War II.

Gun Battery David A. Russell, located within Fort Stevens State Park in Hammond, Oregon, is also named in Russell's honor.

== See also ==
- List of American Civil War generals (Union)
