= George Johnson =

George Johnson may refer to:

== Arts and entertainment ==
- George W. Johnson (singer) (1846–1914), American singer, early recording artist
- George Perry Johnson (1885–1977), American film producer, writer, and newsreel producer
- George Johnson (actor) (1898–1961), American actor
- George Johnson (musician) (1913–1987), jazz saxophonist and clarinetist
- George Johnson (artist) (1926–2021), Australian artist
- George M. Johnson (writer) (born 1985), American author and activist
- George Johnson (aka Lightnin' Licks, born 1953), American musician, member of The Brothers Johnson

== Military ==
- George Owen Johnson (1896–1980), Canadian aviator, RCAF Air Marshal and WWI ace
- George Johnson (British Army officer) (1903–1980)
- George Johnson (general) (1918–2021), United States Air Force general
- George Johnson (supercentenarian) (1894-2006), last surviving WWI veteran of California.
- Johnny Johnson (RAF officer) (George Leonard Johnson, 1921–2022), Royal Air Force officer

== Politics ==
=== Canada ===
- George Macness Johnson (1853–1935), judge and politician in Newfoundland
- George Balfour Johnson (1865–1940), politician in Saskatchewan, Canada
- George William Johnson (politician) (1892–1973), Canadian member of the Legislative Assembly from Manitoba
- George Johnson (Manitoba politician) (1920–1995), Canadian lieutenant-governor of Manitoba

=== U.S. ===
- George W. Johnson (governor) (1811–1862), Confederate governor of Kentucky
- George Y. Johnson (1820–1872), New York politician
- George Alonzo Johnson (1824–1903), 49er, Colorado River steamboat entrepreneur and California politician
  - George A. Johnson & Company
- George A. Johnson (1829–1894), attorney general of the state of California
- George William Johnson (congressman) (1869–1944), American congressman from West Virginia
- George E. Q. Johnson (1874–1949), U.S. federal judge
- George W. Johnson (Minnesota politician) (1894–1974), speaker of the Minnesota House of Representatives and 28th Mayor of Duluth, Minnesota
- George R. Johnson (1929–1973), Pennsylvania politician
- George Dean Johnson Jr. (born 1942), member of the South Carolina House of Representatives

=== Other politicians ===
- George Johnson (MP for Devizes) (1626–1683)
- George Johnson (Australian politician) (1811–1902), member of the Victorian Legislative Assembly
- George Randall Johnson (1833–1919), British cricketer and member of the New Zealand Legislative Council
- George Johnson (Independent Labour Party politician) (1872–1958), British socialist politician

== Sports ==
=== Association football ===
- George Johnson (footballer, born 1871) (1871–1934), English football forward (Walsall, Aston Villa)
- George Johnson (footballer, born 1904) (1904–1985) was an English footballer (Ashington, Reading, Sheffield Wednesday, Watford)
- George Johnson (footballer, born 1907) (1907–1989), English football fullback (Wigan Borough, Darlington)
- George Johnson (football manager), Leicester City manager

=== Basketball ===
- George E. Johnson (basketball) (born 1947), American ABA/NBA player
- George T. Johnson (born 1948), American NBA player
- George L. Johnson (born 1956), American NBA player

=== Other sports ===
- George S. Johnson (1879–1948), Australian rules footballer
- Chief Johnson (1886–1922), American baseball player
- George Johnson (baseball) (1890–1940), American baseball outfielder in the Negro leagues
- George Johnson (cricketer, born 1894) (1894–1965), English cricketer
- George Johnson (cricketer, born 1907) (1907–1986), English cricketer
- George Johnson (sport shooter) (1915–2006), Puerto Rican Olympic shooter
- George Johnson (athlete) (born 1938), Liberian athlete
- George Johnson (boxer) (1938–2016), American heavyweight boxer
- George Johnson (American football player) (born 1989), American football defensive end
- George Johnson (American football coach), head football coach at Bucknell University from 1915 to 1917
- Chappie Johnson (George Johnson, 1877–1949), American baseball player and team manager, Negro leagues career 1896–1919

== Writers ==
- George William Johnson (writer) (1802–1886), British writer
- George Metcalf Johnson (1885–1965), American mystery and western writer, also wrote as George Metcalf
- George Clayton Johnson (1929–2015), American science fiction writer
- George B. Johnson (born 1942), American science writer
- George Johnson (writer) (born 1952), American science writer, including for The New York Times
- George Washington Johnson (poet) (1839–1917), Canadian schoolteacher and poet

== Others ==
- George Johnson (priest) (1808–1881), British clergyman and academic
- George Henry Martin Johnson (1816–1884), Iroquois chief
- George Johnson (physician) (1818–1896), English physician
- George Johnson (statistician) (1837-1911), Canadian statistician
- George Raymond Johnson (1840–1898), English architect in Australia
- George Lindsay Johnson (1853–1943), British ophthalmologist
- George F. Johnson (1857–1948), American businessman
- George Marion Johnson (1900–1987), American law professor and academic administrator
- George E. Johnson (businessman) (1927–2026), American businessman
- George W. Johnson (academic) (1928–2017), American academic and academic administrator
- George Johnson, Tongass tribal chief and namesake of the Chief Johnson totem pole

== Other uses ==
- USS George A. Johnson, a United States Navy destroyer escort in commission from 1944 to 1946 and from 1950 to 1957
- USS George H. Johnson (SP-379), the proposed name and designation of a commercial freight lighter the United States Navy considered for service during World War I but never acquired
- George P. Johnson, an American multinational corporation

== See also ==
- George Johnston (disambiguation)
- George Johnstone (disambiguation)
