= George Johnston =

George Johnston may refer to:

== Law and politics ==
- George Johnston (burgess) (1720–1766), American lawyer and politician
- George Johnston (Royal Marines officer) (1764–1823), Scottish colonial administrator in Australia
- George Graham Johnston (1882–1960), Canadian politician in Ontario
- George Johnston (Canadian politician) (1884–1977), Canadian politician

== Military ==
- George Doherty Johnston (1832–1910), American confederate army general
- George Napier Johnston (1867–1947), British army officer in New Zealand
- George Johnston (general) (1868–1949), Australian army general

== Sports ==
- George Johnston (Australian footballer) (1877–1945), Australian rules footballer
- George "Blue" Johnston (1907–?), Australian rules footballer
- George Johnston (ice hockey) (1920–2006), Canadian ice hockey player
- George Johnston (footballer, born 1947) (1947–2025), Scottish footballer
- George Johnston (footballer, born 1998), English footballer

== Others ==
- George Johnston (naturalist) (1797–1855), Scottish naturalist and physician
- George Bain Johnston (1829–1882), Scottish pioneer in Australia
- George Johnston (engineer) (1855–1945), Scottish engineer and motorcar designer
- George Lawson Johnston, 1st Baron Luke (1873–1943), British businessman
- George Johnston (novelist) (1912–1970), Australian novelist
- George Benson Johnston (1913–2004), Canadian poet
- George Weir Johnston (1932–2020), British surgeon
- George Robert Johnston (1954–2004), Canadian burglar, a.k.a. the "Ballarat Bandit"

== See also ==
- George Johnstone (disambiguation)
- George Johnson (disambiguation)
