= George William Johnson =

George William Johnson may refer to:

- George William Johnson (congressman) (1869–1944), lawyer and Democratic politician, United States Representative from West Virginia
- George William Johnson (politician) (1892–1973), Canadian politician
- George William Johnson (writer)

== See also ==
- George Johnson (disambiguation)
