= George Johnstone =

George Johnstone may refer to:

- George Johnstone (footballer, born 1914) (1914–1974), Scottish football goalkeeper, played for Aberdeen, Dunfermline, Raith and Morton
- George Johnstone (Australian footballer) (1869–1956), Australian rules footballer
- George Johnstone (Royal Navy officer) (1730–1787), British naval officer and member of parliament
- George Johnstone (congressman) (1846–1921), U.S. Representative from South Carolina
- George Johnstone (British Army officer) (died 1825), general in the Peninsula war
- George Harcourt Vanden-Bampde-Johnstone, 3rd Baron Derwent (1899–1949), British diplomat and author
- George Johnstone (1764–1813), English politician, MP for Aldeburgh 1800–1802 and for Hedon 1802–1813
- George Whitton Johnstone (1849–1901), Scottish artist

== See also ==
- George Johnston (disambiguation)
- George Johnson (disambiguation)
