= George Washington Johnson =

George Washington Johnson may refer to:

- George W. Johnson (singer), singer and early recording artist
- George W. Johnson (governor), Kentucky politician and US Civil War figure
- George Washington Johnson (poet) (1839–1917), Canadian schoolteacher and poet

== See also ==
- George Johnson (disambiguation)
