= New Zealand Division =

Infantry division of the New Zealand Expeditionary Force

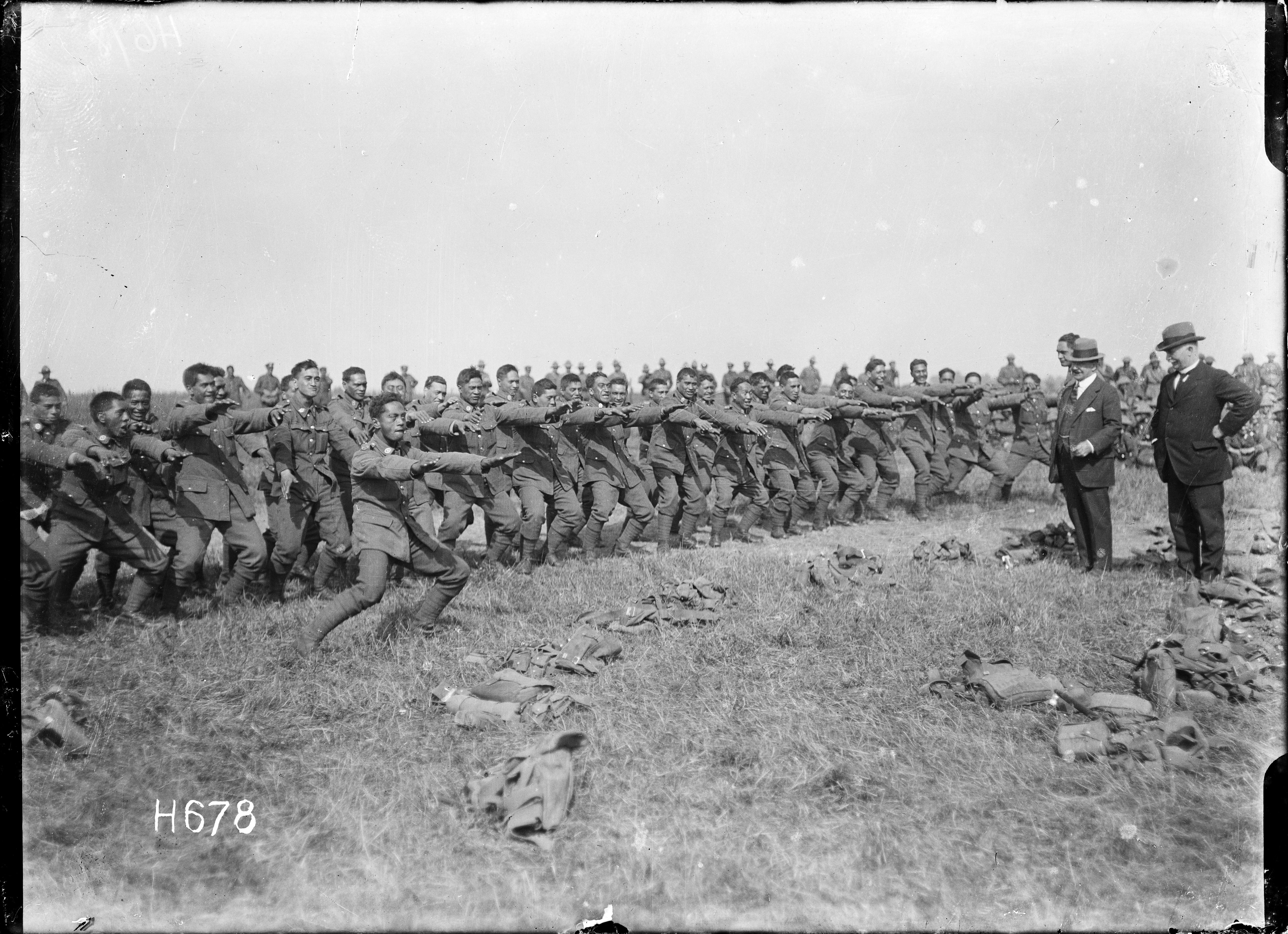
- Soldiers from the Pioneer Battalion performing a haka, June 1918
- Active: 1916–19
- Country: New Zealand
- Branch: New Zealand Military Forces
- Type: Infantry
- Size: ~15,000
- Engagements: First World War: Western Front

Commanders
- Notable commanders: Andrew Russell

The New Zealand Division was an infantry division of the New Zealand Expeditionary Force raised for service in the First World War. It was formed in Egypt in early 1916 when the New Zealand and Australian Division was renamed after the detachment of its Australian personnel left the New Zealand Infantry Brigade, together with reinforcements from New Zealand, as the basis of the division. It was commanded by Major General Andrew Hamilton Russell for the duration of the war.

The division saw service on the Western Front in France and Belgium, fighting in major battles at the Somme, Messines and Broodseinde Ridge throughout 1916 and 1917. All were notable successes for the New Zealanders but the division suffered a serious defeat at Passchendaele on 12 October 1917, its most costly day of the war.

In early 1918, the division helped blunt the German spring offensive at the Somme, before the Allies went on the offensive in August. During the Hundred Days' Offensive that followed, it was one of the lead divisions of the Third Army and advanced 100 kilometres (62 mi) in 75 days. The division's last major engagement of the war was at Le Quesnoy in early November 1918. During the latter stages of the war, the New Zealand Division was one of the strongest divisions of the Dominion serving on the Western Front. After the armistice, it served on occupation duties in Germany before being disbanded in 1919.

== Background ==
Following the outbreak of the First World War, the New Zealand government authorised the formation of the New Zealand Expeditionary Force (NZEF), under the command of Major General Alexander Godley, for service abroad. By October 1914, there were sufficient volunteers to form two brigades, the New Zealand Infantry Brigade and the New Zealand Mounted Brigade. These two formations formed the main body of the NZEF and, together with the Australian 4th Infantry Brigade and the 1st Light Horse Brigade, were the basis of the New Zealand and Australian Division, which fought in the Gallipoli campaign against the Turks.

In December 1915, the much depleted New Zealand and Australian Division was evacuated from Gallipoli, and was placed in reserve near the Suez Canal. Although there were concerns that the Turks might attack the canal, it was envisaged that the division would soon be called upon to serve elsewhere. Commanded by Major General Andrew Hamilton Russell, it was replenished with reinforcements from Australia and New Zealand and began a program of intensive training.

Since the deployment of the main body of the NZEF, the numbers of volunteers had steadily increased to the point that they could no longer be integrated into either of the two existing brigades. In January 1916, the commander of the Mediterranean Expeditionary Force in Egypt, Lieutenant General Sir Archibald Murray, proposed the number of available New Zealand personnel warranted the establishment of two new brigades which, together with the existing brigade, would form a New Zealand infantry division for service on the Western Front. The New Zealand government, initially concerned by the prospect of maintaining three infantry brigades, concurred after Murray reassured it that the number of personnel in Egypt were sufficient to keep the new division up to strength in the short term.

== Formation ==
The New Zealand Division officially came into being at Moascar, Egypt, on 1 March 1916, when the New Zealand and Australian Division was so renamed. (Note: Earlier in 1916, the Australian components of the old New Zealand and Australian Division, 1st Light Horse and 4th Brigade, had been attached to the newly formed ANZAC Mounted Division and Australian 4th Division respectively.) Russell, a well regarded senior officer of the Territorial Force who had performed well during the Gallipoli Campaign, was appointed the commander of the new formation.

The former New Zealand Infantry Brigade was to be the first of three infantry brigades of the division. The 1st Brigade was commanded by Brigadier General Francis Earl Johnston, who had led the original brigade at Gallipoli. The 2nd Brigade was formed from reinforcements currently in Egypt; this was commanded by another Gallipoli veteran, Brigadier General William Garnett Braithwaite. The third infantry brigade, known as the Rifle Brigade, was commanded by Brigadier General Harry Fulton. (Note: Each brigade had four battalions; the 1st and 2nd Brigades included a battalion formed from personnel drawn from each of the military districts of New Zealand: Auckland, Wellington, Canterbury and Otago. The four battalions of the Rifle Brigade had no such regional differentiation.) The division also included the Otago Mounted Rifles Regiment; one squadron was designated as the Divisional Mounted Troops while the remaining two squadrons were integrated into a pioneer battalion alongside Māori personnel. There were also three brigades of field artillery and one of howitzers. In total, the division had some 15,000 men in its ranks.

Along with the Australian 1st and 2nd Divisions, the New Zealand Division was to form part of I ANZAC Corps, under the command of Godley. (Note: Godley also retained overall command of the NZEF and did so for the duration of the war.) In early March, the New Zealand Division assumed responsibility for the section of the Suez Canal guarded by the 2nd Division, which began to embark for France. After three weeks of sentry duty, the New Zealand Division returned to its Moascar base before it too was shipped to France in early April.

== Western Front ==
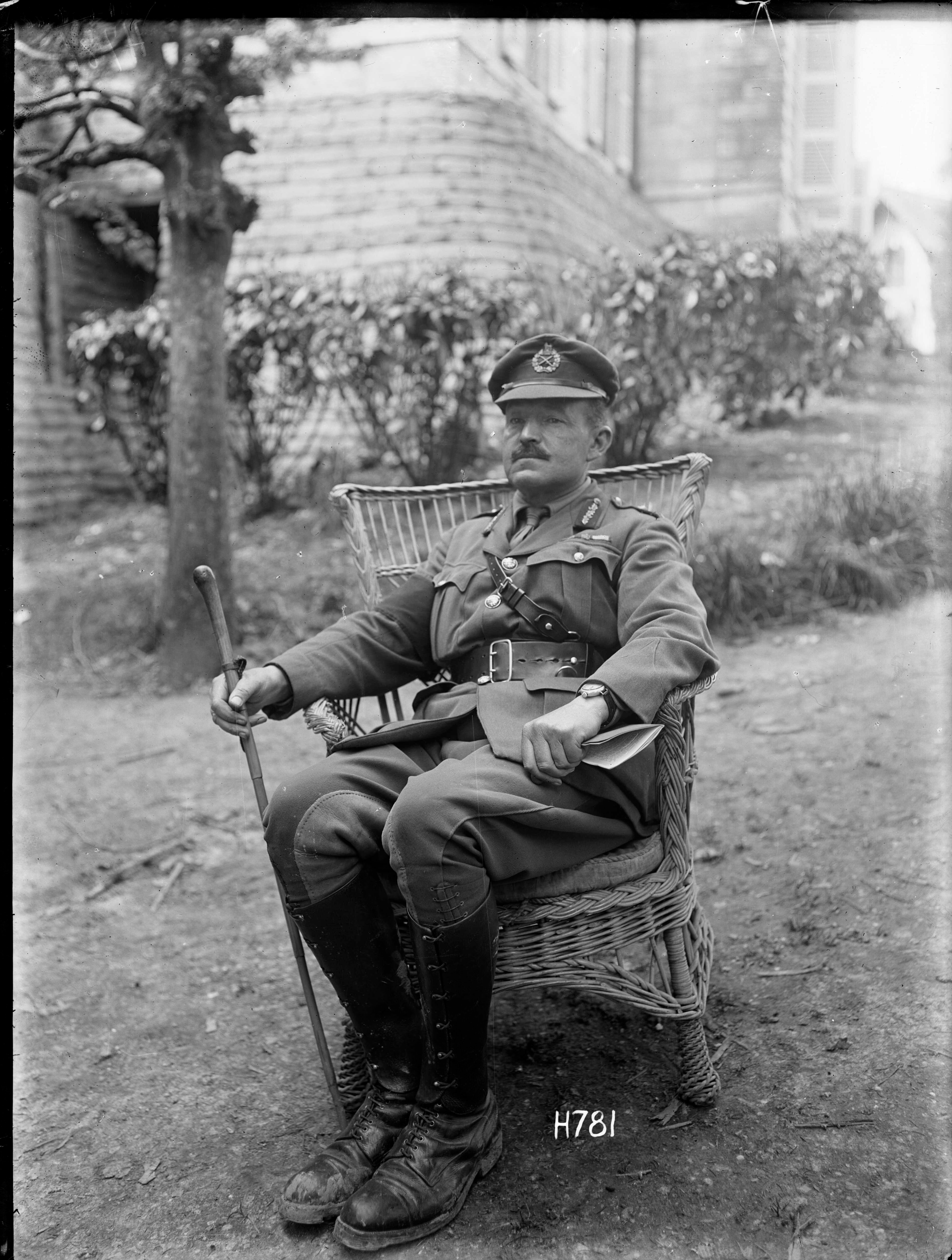
Major General Andrew Hamilton Russell, seen here at divisional headquarters on 21 May 1918, commanded the New Zealand Division for the duration of the war

The divisions of I ANZAC Corps, now commanded by Lieutenant General William Birdwood with Godley taking over II ANZAC Corps, were initially based in the Armentières sector where they would undergo intensive training in trench warfare on the Western Front. The Armentières front line was regarded by the Allies as a nursery sector where new units could undergo familiarisation without being called upon for intensive offensive operations.

Nevertheless, it was not an easy introduction to the front for the New Zealanders. On arriving in their sector, they found the defensive arrangements to be poor and immediately set about improving the trenches and wire emplacements. Although the bulk of the division's personnel manned secondary defences rearward of the front line to avoid the German artillery, the forward areas had to be constantly patrolled as a deterrent to an attack and to give the impression they were fully manned. The static nature of the war meant that the Divisional Mounted Troops, intended to be used as scouts, were redundant and, along with two Light Horse squadrons from the Australian infantry divisions, were soon transferred to a new formation designated 1st ANZAC Light Horse Regiment. In July, the New Zealand Division was transferred to the newly arrived II ANZAC Corps while I ANZAC moved south to the Somme.

The New Zealanders would follow in due course but in the meantime, General Sir Douglas Haig, the commander of the British Expeditionary Force (BEF), called for diversionary actions to attract the attention of the German High Command away from the Allied preparations for the forthcoming offensive on the Somme. To achieve this, the New Zealanders mounted several trench raids. By the time the New Zealand Division was relieved in August, it had incurred 2,500 casualties, including 375 dead.

=== Battle of the Somme ===
After a period of refit and training, in September 1916 the New Zealand Division was assigned to XV Corps which, at the time, was participating in the Somme Offensive. On 15 September, the 2nd Brigade and the Rifle Brigade, with the 1st Brigade in reserve, participated in the Battle of Flers-Courcelette. The attack, as planned, was to capture a number of German-held trench systems in successive advances by alternating battalions; the first objective was the Switch trench complex, designated as the Green Line, with the next two being the Brown and Blue Lines. The Blue Line included the Flers trench network. The final objective was the Grove Alley trench complex, designated Red Line. The attack was to be preceded by a three-day preparatory bombardment and the division was also to be supported by tanks, which were being used for the first time. Four tanks were assigned to the division's sector. The advance of the New Zealanders was to be flanked by corresponding movements of the neighbouring British 41st and 47th Divisions.

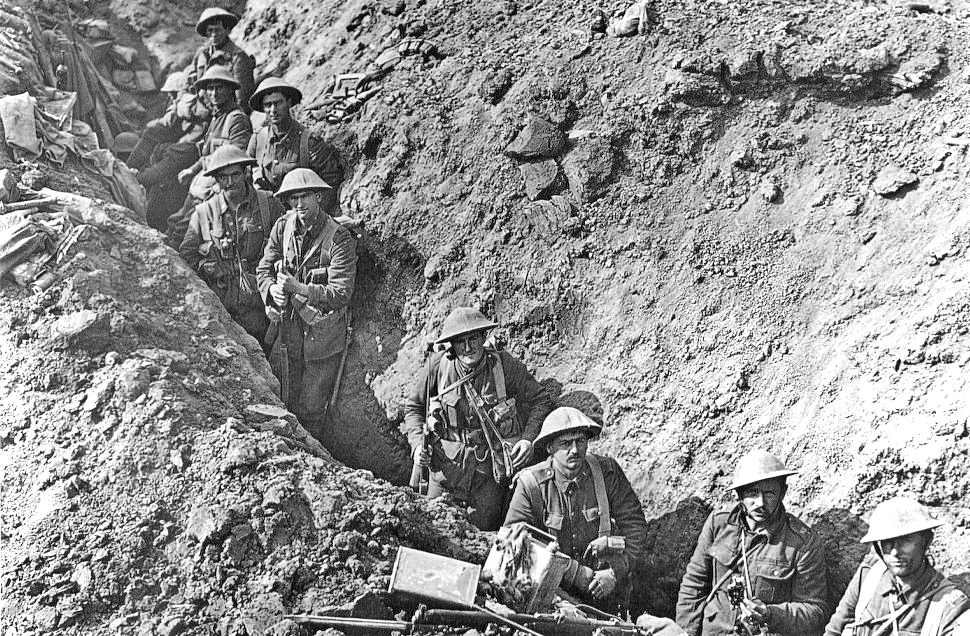
Infantry from the 2nd Brigade's Auckland Battalion, New Zealand Division, in the Switch Line near Flers, taken some time in September 1916, after the Battle of Flers-Courcelette

At 6:20 am, following the creeping artillery barrage that had been laid down by the divisional guns, the 2nd Brigade's Auckland and Otago Battalions advanced on their first objective, the Switch trench complex, and seized it within an hour. Losses were heavy on the left side of the advance; the forward movement of the 47th Division was held up and this exposed the 2nd Otago Battalion to enfilade fire as they continued onto Switch trench. (Note: Sergeant Donald Brown won the division's first Victoria Cross (VC) for his actions in dealing with machine gun posts that briefly delayed the advance. He was subsequently killed in action later in the Somme Offensive, on 1 October 1916.)

It was planned for the 4th Battalion of the Rifle Brigade, with the benefit of tank support, to leapfrog the 2nd Brigade and move onto the next objective. However, the tanks suffered mechanical problems and failed to arrive on time. The battalion moved on regardless and secured the Brown Line by 7:50 am. The tanks followed on, and one was knocked out of action by artillery fire. The remaining tanks moved onto the Blue Line. The advance, now led by the 2nd and 3rd Battalions of the Rifle Brigade, was beginning to slow. The preparatory bombardment had failed to clear barbed wire ahead of the Flers trench and the infantry had gone to ground to await the tanks. Arriving at 10:30 am, they crushed the wire and allowed the 3rd Battalion to clear the trenches of its garrison, the 5th Bavarian Regiment; 145 were taken prisoner.

Efforts were made to consolidate the newly captured positions. The 41st Division, on the right flank, had reached its portion of the Blue Line and captured Flers but the 47th Division lagged behind. The New Zealanders remained exposed to enfilade fire along their left flank and German artillery fire also hampered attempts to shore up their positions. The 1st Battalion of the Rifle Brigade began an attack on the final objective, Red Line, at 10:50 am and secured a portion of the Grove Alley trenches by midday despite heavy casualties. However, the 47th Division had still not been able to secure its first objective while the 41st Division had to withdraw from Flers village. This left the New Zealanders in a salient exposed to heavy machine gun fire on both flanks. At 2:00 pm Germans were spotted advancing from the northeast. Captain Lindsay Inglis, the senior surviving officer in this area of Grove Alley, gave orders to strengthen the corresponding section of the line. When a platoon began moving to effect the order, this was misinterpreted as a withdrawal and the remaining elements of the battalion began to pull out to Flers village. Inglis was able to check the withdrawal, but with only 120 men, he opted to dig in where they were rather than try to reoccupy Grove Alley. (Note: Inglis was later awarded the Military Cross for his actions during the battle. He also served in the Second World War and briefly commanded the 2nd New Zealand Division.)

Despite several counterattacks during the afternoon, the New Zealanders managed to hold their front line, including the village of Flers, although both flanks remained exposed due to the failure of 41st and 47th Divisions to reach or hold their frontage of the Blue Line. It was a successful day for the division; it had captured the most ground of all the divisions of XV Corps involved in the battle. It had also reached all four of its objectives although it ended the day in possession of three plus Flers itself, which was actually in 41st Division's sector.

To strengthen the division's positions, the 1st Brigade was brought forward into the front lines overnight. The next day, an attack was launched by the brigade's 1st Wellington Battalion. Supported by artillery, which suppressed an attack made by the Germans minutes before the start of the battalion's advance from Flers Village, Grove Alley was captured. That evening the weather deteriorated and over the next few days rain filled trenches and shell holes, and turned the ground to thick mud. The New Zealanders were continually harassed by German artillery and localised attacks from the spur overlooking Grove Alley. Despite the conditions, the 1st Brigade carried out operations to strengthen the division's exposed left flank, but it remained vulnerable to enfilade fire from the German positions.

An attack had been planned for 18 September but was postponed due to the poor weather. On 25 September, the attack went ahead. It was intended to extend the front to high ground that was known as Factory Corner. The high ground was undefended, and the 1st Brigade easily captured it under the cover of a creeping barrage. Two days later, Factory Corner formed the launchpad for a further attack by the brigade and the neighbouring 55th Division on two more trenchlines, designated Gird Trench and Gird Support. This time, the attack was not as straightforward and it took an extra day before the entire objective was in New Zealand hands. On 1 October, as a preliminary to the Battle of Le Transloy, 2nd Brigade's Otago and Canterbury battalions captured strongpoints near Eaucourt L'Abbaye, which fell to the 47th Division two days later.

By the time of its withdrawal from the front lines on 4 October, the New Zealand Division had suffered 7,000 casualties (killed in action, wounded and missing), 1,500 of them fatal, since 15 September. On the opening day of the battle alone, there were 2,050 casualties from the 6,000 men who joined the fighting.

=== Restructuring ===
The division, now reattached to II ANZAC Corps, moved north in mid-October and replaced the 5th Australian Division at Sailly. It remained here, patrolling the sector and mounting raids, into February 1917. The men of the division had become fatigued through their service on the Western Front. While the 2nd and Rifle Brigades soon recovered, the 1st Brigade, having many Gallipoli veterans, continued to struggle as did Johnston, its commander. Consequently, Russell sent him on leave and reorganised the brigades.

The 1st Brigade swapped its two South Island battalions (1st Canterbury and 1st Otago) with the two North Island battalions (2nd Auckland and 2nd Wellington) of the 2nd Brigade. This placed all the North Island battalions in the 1st Brigade while all the South Island formations were in the 2nd Brigade. The four artillery brigades were reduced to three by distributing the batteries of the fourth amongst the others, one of which came under the direct control of II ANZAC Corps.

This period also saw the formation of the 4th Brigade in England, in response to a request made by the British War Office to the New Zealand government for another infantry division. Although their numbers were insufficient for a new division, personnel from New Zealand were arriving in the various NZEF depots in Europe at a much higher rate than they were being lost from the division due to casualties and attrition. By early 1917, there was a reserve of around 10,000 men available with which to draw upon for the new brigade without adversely affecting the ability to replace existing troops in the field, in the short term at least. The brigade's core units were four infantry battalions designated as the 3rd Battalions of the Auckland, Wellington, Canterbury and Otago Regiments. Newly promoted Brigadier General Herbert Ernest Hart was appointed by Godley as the brigade's commander, and after a rigorous training programme, curtailed by orders to report to France, it embarked for the front on 29 May 1917. With four infantry brigades, the New Zealand Division was now the strongest Dominion formation fighting in France with 20,000 personnel. However, Russell did not like his division's four-brigade structure (the remainder of the British and Dominion infantry divisions had three brigades) as he continually had to fend off requests to use the extra brigade for labouring work in the corps rear area.

In the meantime, the division had been moved to Flanders in February 1917. Initially based at Steenwerck, the following month it shifted north to the Messines area, which was south of Ypres, to relieve the 36th Division.

=== Battle of Messines ===
By mid-1917, Haig was planning an offensive in the heavily defended Ypres region of Flanders. His plan involved a series of steps, the first of which was the capture of Messines Ridge by II ANZAC Corps. The New Zealand Division, already in the Messines sector, was given the task of capturing Messines Village and it began intensive training for the forthcoming battle under the close supervision of Russell. Extensive preparatory work was carried out, with transportation infrastructure laid down and ample supplies of shells brought forward for the artillery.

The plan of attack, broken into three phases, called for the 2nd and Rifle Brigades to carry out an initial advance to the trenches on the western slopes of the Messines ridge as well as the village itself. The 1st Brigade was then to take over for the second phase and advance to the eastern slope of the ridge, an objective designated the Black Line. The final phase was also to involve the 1st Brigade, which was to push the front line out 270 metres (300 yd) via a series of outposts, designated the Dotted Black Line. This outpost line would serve as the starting point for the advance of the 4th Australian Division, which was to continue the attack to what was designated as the Green Line, a mile from the crest of the ridge.

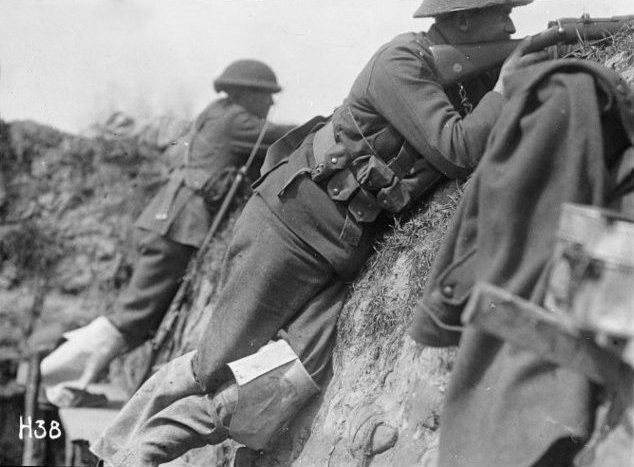
New Zealand troops manning the trenches in the Messines sector, May 1917

Following a preparatory artillery barrage which began on 3 June, the battle commenced in the early hours of 7 June with the explosion of several mines which had been dug under the German lines. Over a million pounds (about 450 tonnes) of explosive were used, and the tremors were felt as far away as London. The New Zealanders were in the centre of the II ANZAC front, flanked by the British 25th Division and the 3rd Australian Division. This marked the first time the Australians and New Zealanders had fought alongside each other in a major engagement on the Western Front. The 2nd and Rifle Brigades quickly moved forward; the surviving German soldiers encountered initially were still dazed from the detonation of the mines and were quickly subdued and made prisoners of war. They continued to advance into stiffening resistance, but these opponents, soldiers of the 40th (Saxon) and 3rd (Bavarian) Divisions, were soon dealt with and the outskirts of Messines village were within sight. The Rifle Brigade's 3rd Battalion was attacking the village when it was slowed by two machine gun posts. Corporal Samuel Frickleton led his section on a successful foray to deal with them for which he was later awarded the VC.

As planned, the 1st Brigade reached the Black Line shortly after 5:00 am and began preparing for the next phase of the advance, the establishment of the Dotted Black Line. By 9:00 am, under the cover of a creeping artillery barrage, platoons from the brigade's 2nd Auckland Battalion moved forward and formed a series of outposts, some of which were close to the Green Line. They were well dug in by midday, and handily placed to fend off German counterattacks. At 3:00 pm, the advance was continued by the 4th Australian Division, supported by the New Zealand artillery. The 1st Brigade in the meantime consolidated its positions. That evening, aware that the Germans were likely to lay down a retaliatory artillery barrage, Russell ordered that only a minimum number of troops were to remain in Messines and most personnel moved back to their original positions. The next day, the expected barrage began. The New Zealanders remained in position until 9 June, when they were relieved by the 4th Australian Division.

It was a successful operation for the division; all objectives were achieved on schedule, with over 400 Germans, several field guns, and numerous machine guns and trench mortars being captured. Losses in the division amounted to 3,700 casualties, most of which were actually incurred while holding the captured ground. These casualties were inflicted despite Russell's attempts to keep the number of soldiers in the front line defences to a minimum and to rely on artillery and machine guns as his primary means for defending against counterattacks. The day after the battle, Russell was visiting the Le Moulin de l'Hospice, captured by 1st Brigade, when an artillery barrage opened up. This killed the brigade's commander, Brigadier General Charles Brown, the first general officer of the NZEF to be killed in action. On 12 June, the division was back manning the front lines to the southeast of Messines, mounting raids and pushing outposts forward into German territory and generally consolidating their positions. It was finally withdrawn from the sector at the end of the month for rest and recuperation.

The division returned to the area in mid-July, tasked with minor operations intended to keep German attention away from the sector north of Ypres, which was to be the focus of renewed fighting as Haig continued with his planned offensive. Russell had his brigades man the division's section in rotation; those not in the trenches spent their time training. During this period, the New Zealanders captured the village of La Basseville but subsequently lost it to a German counterattack. At the end of the month, 2nd Wellington Battalion, 1st Brigade, retook the village with Lance-Corporal Leslie Andrew playing a key role in the action; he was later awarded the VC for his efforts. Over the following few weeks the men of the division worked to consolidate their positions in waterlogged trenches, rain having set in. Casualties were still incurred during this period including Brigadier General Johnston, killed by a sniper on 7 August while inspecting his new command, the Rifle Brigade. His replacement, Brigadier General Robert Young, was severely wounded by another sniper just two days later.

=== Ypres Offensive ===
In September, II ANZAC Corps was detailed for the ongoing offensive in Ypres, the Battle of Passchendaele (also known as the Third Battle of Ypres). Haig wanted Passchendaele Ridge in British hands by winter through a series of limited actions to be carried out across September and October. The initial role of the New Zealand Division was to launch an attack on Gravenstafel Spur, running off the Passchendaele Ridge, as part of what would become known as the Battle of Broodseinde. The attack was part of an overall strategy to capture the ridges running in front of Passchendaele, prior to an attack on the village itself.

==== Battle of Broodseinde ====
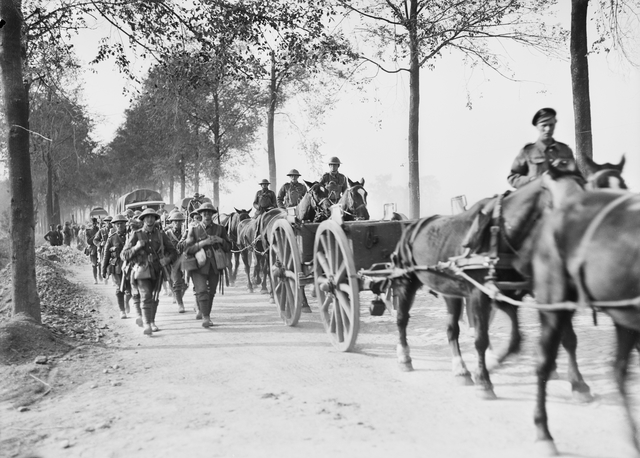
New Zealand infantry marching up to the Ypres sector in anticipation of the attack on Gravenstafel Spur, September 1917

In the weeks leading up to the battle, the division repeatedly practiced the tactics it would employ in its attack on Gravenstafel Spur. When it moved into the front line, its frontage was approximately 2,000 metres (2,200 yd). The 4th Brigade moved into the southern portion of the line on 2 October. On its right was the 3rd Australian Division, while on its left flank was the 1st Brigade. The 48th Division (of XVIII Corps) was to the left of the 1st Brigade. Together with the 1st Brigade, the 4th Brigade was tasked with two objectives, the Red Line and the Blue Line. The 1st Auckland and Wellington battalions of 1st Brigade, together with the 3rd Auckland and Canterbury battalions of 4th Brigade, were to advance to and secure the Red Line, running along the crest of the ridge. The other two battalions of the respective brigades would then leapfrog their predecessors through the Red Line to take the Blue Line, at the bottom of the Belluvue Spur.

On 4 October, preceded by an artillery barrage beginning at 6:00 am, the division began its offensive with the infantry advancing behind a creeping barrage, which caught a mass of German troops, preparing for their own attack, out in the open. The German infantry, battered by the artillery fire, were swiftly dealt with by the advancing New Zealanders. Despite the presence of pillboxes, the Red Line was reached on schedule, with some limited mopping up operations conducted forward of the line by parties from the advancing battalions. Having moved up to the Red Line behind the attacking forces, at 8:10 am, the next phase of the advance began as infantry from the remaining battalions of 1st and 4th Brigades moved forward to the Blue Line. Despite some resistance from machine gun nests and pockets of infantry sheltering in shell holes, the Blue Line was reached at 9:30 am. Rain began to fall later that afternoon, and the ground quickly became boggy. For the next two days, under the protection of heavy artillery support, both brigades consolidated their positions and established trench lines. The Germans mounted some small-scale counterattacks but these were easily dealt with. From 5 October, the rain began to set in, making movement of men and equipment to the front line difficult. On 6 October, the New Zealanders were relieved by the 49th Division.

The attack was a success with the brigades taking all their objectives on schedule. The 4th Brigade captured 700 prisoners of war, for the loss of 130 men killed, and over 600 wounded. In the 1st Brigade, 192 were killed along with 700 wounded. From its starting positions, the division made gains of around 1,000 metres. Both Godley and Russell were pleased with the outcome and pushed for further involvement by the New Zealand Division in the ongoing offensive.

Buoyed by the success of 4 October, Haig brought forward the next phase of the offensive, the Battle of Poelcappelle, by a day, to 9 October. The British divisions of Godley's II ANZAC Corps were to be involved in the initial attack, which was to be followed by an advance on Passchendaele by the New Zealand Division on 12 October.

==== First Battle of Passchendaele ====
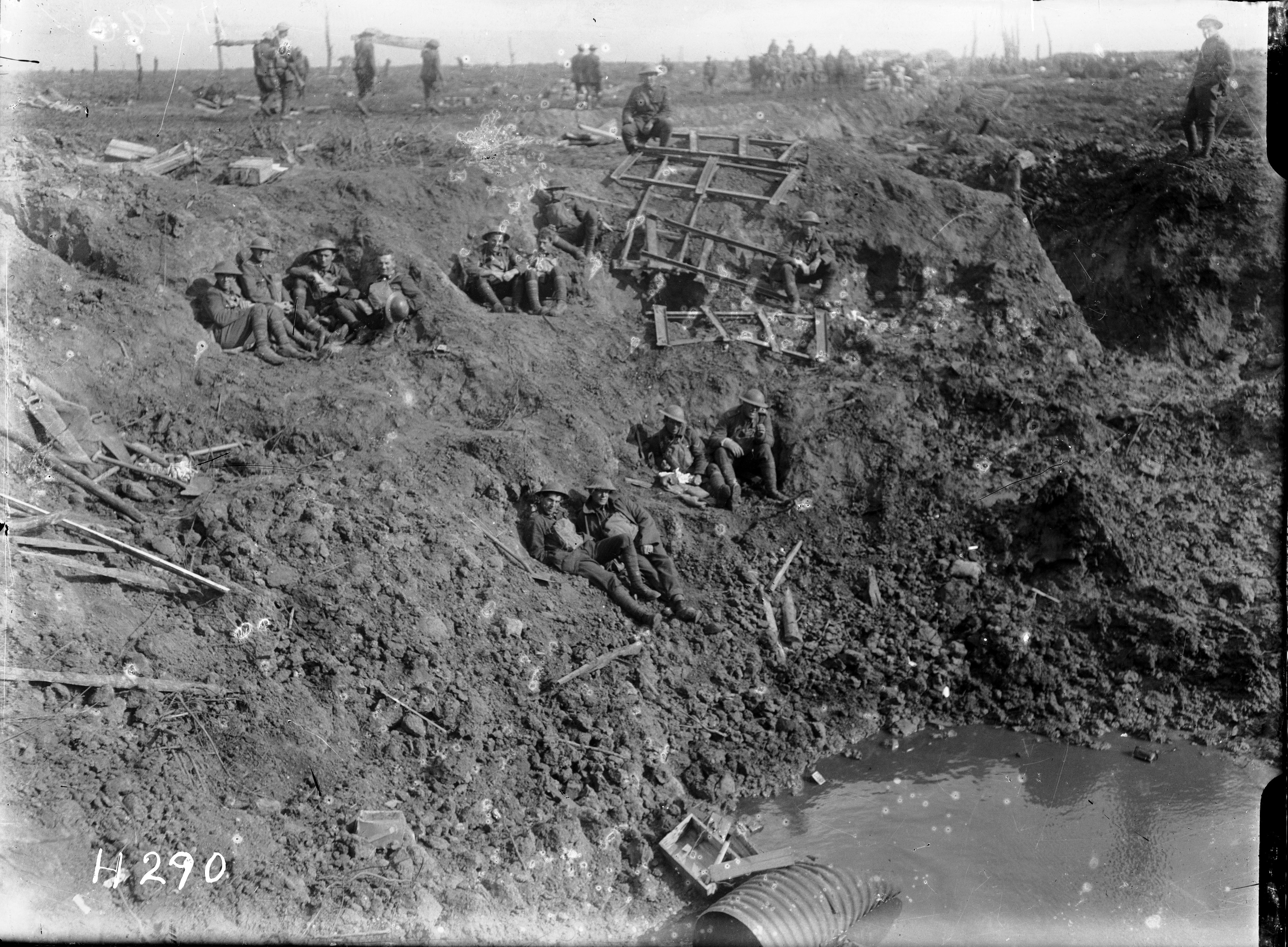
New Zealand engineers resting in a large shell hole at Spree Farm during the First Battle of Passchendaele, 12 October 1917

Godley's II ANZAC Corps had limited time to prepare for the Battle of Poelcappelle, which was intended to set a good base for an attack on Passchendaele itself by capturing the Belluvue Spur. Its attack proved to be a failure, with no significant advancement of the front lines made by the two British divisions involved, the 49th and 66th Divisions. Several battalions were unable to reach their starting positions by the scheduled time and, once the attack began, they were held up by the mud and German defensive positions. For the sake of a few hundred metres, there were 5,700 casualties. Despite this, Godley, keen for Passchendaele to fall to his II ANZAC Corps, pushed ahead with the 12 October attack. Haig, misled by erroneous reports from Godley's headquarters that the Poelcappelle attack had achieved similar gains to those made on 4 October, concurred. Once Haig discovered the error, Godley reassured him that Passchendaele could still fall to his corps. Needing to restore Haig's faith in his leadership, Godley disregarded the warnings of his senior artillery and engineer officers that ground conditions were not favourable; the winter rain had set in following Broodseinde and, together with the time constraints, had been a key factor in the compromised preparations for the Poelcappelle attack. The Passchendaele attack, scheduled for 12 October, would likewise be hampered by limited preparation time and boggy terrain.

The attack was to involve the New Zealand Division's 2nd and Rifle Brigades, with 4th Brigade in reserve, attacking along Belluvue Spur and onto Goudberg Spur while the 3rd Australian Division, on the right of the New Zealanders, attempted to take Passchendaele itself. On the division's left was the 9th (Scottish) Division. The plan required both New Zealand brigades to advance with a one-battalion frontage, with three battalions of each brigade leapfrogging each other in sequence to capture objectives designated Red, Blue and Green lines, the last of which was Goudberg Spur.

The New Zealanders had a number of preparatory hurdles to overcome before the battle. The men of the Rifle Brigade had, for the previous few weeks, been carrying out engineering work for II ANZAC Corps and were fatigued. The ongoing rainfall affected both the roads by which the division had to move to its starting positions and the placement of the supporting artillery. The muddy ground did not provide a stable platform for the guns and howitzers. Furthermore, the artillery barrage targeting the barbed wire emplacements protecting the strongpoints on the slopes of Belluvue Spur failed to destroy them, a fact determined by scouts on 11 October. Once this information reached the brigade commanders, Braithwaite and A. E. Stewart, the commander of the Rifle Brigade following Young's wounding, they pressed Russell for cancellation of the attack; this was refused.

Early in the morning of 12 October, the Germans, already on the alert, bombarded the areas where the New Zealand infantry were assembling prior to commencing their advance. This, along with several rounds of New Zealander artillery that fell short, inflicted numerous casualties until the New Zealanders completed their barrage at 5:25 am and began moving forward. Their advance was slowed by ground conditions and machine gun fire from both their front and flanks. They stalled after reaching the wire, arranged in two belts. The following battalions began to catch up to the leading unit, the 2nd Otago Battalion, filling its depleted ranks, but were also held up by the wire. Some parties, led by subalterns and non-commissioned officers, managed to breach the wire and attack the German pillboxes beyond, but when their leaders were killed, the survivors began to dig in. It was 8:00 am and the front line had been advanced by barely 320 metres (350 yd).

By mid-morning, it was apparent that the failure of the New Zealanders to advance their section of the front exposed the left flank of the neighbouring 3rd Australian Division, which had secured its first objective and was pushing on to its second. Likewise, on the New Zealand Division's left, the 9th (Scottish) Division had managed to reach its final objective. Godley issued new instructions to the New Zealand Division; abandoning any hope of getting to the Green Line, it was to push on to the Blue Line in an attack timed for 3:00 pm. However, by the early afternoon the flanking Scots had been pushed back while the Australians had failed to make further gains and were withdrawing due to enfilade gunfire on the flanks. Braithwaite, warned by his battalion commanders that capturing the Blue Line was impossible, twice pushed Russell for a cancellation of the attack. Russell's initial response was to instruct the Rifle Brigade to continue, but shortly before the attack was to begin, it was abandoned.

The 4th Brigade moved up to the line to relieve the 2nd and Rifle Brigades and remained there until the division was withdrawn to a training area in late October, following the relief of II ANZAC Corps by the Canadian Corps. (Note: Passchendaele Ridge eventually fell to the Canadians after they mounted a series of attacks between 26 October and 10 November.) The division suffered heavy losses on 12 October: about 845 men were killed and a further 1,900 wounded in the worst defeat in New Zealand military history. Although Russell blamed himself for the outcome of the attack and wrote to politicians in New Zealand stating so, in his private correspondence he made it clear that planning and preparation by Godley and his staff at II ANZAC Corps was inadequate and did not take into account the poor ground conditions at Passchendaele.

=== Winter 1917–18 ===
On 1 November 1917, II ANZAC Corps' 3rd Australian Division was transferred to I ANZAC Corps. (Note: This united all five Australian divisions in a single formation, which was later designated the Australian Corps.) As this left the New Zealand Division as the sole representative of the ANZAC divisions in II ANZAC Corps, it was renamed to XXII Corps. The renamed corps returned to the Ypres salient in mid-November 1917, holding a five-mile front along Broodseinde Ridge from the village of Tiber to the Reutelbeek stream. The New Zealand Division took the right sector of this front which was overlooked by a spur topped by the ruined Polderhoek Chateau, occupied by the Germans. On 3 December, the 1st Canterbury and 1st Otago Battalions of the 2nd Brigade mounted an attack against the chateau. The attack, launched at midday in an attempt to surprise the Germans, proved a relative failure; although some ground was taken, the chateau remained in enemy hands. During this action, Private Henry James Nicholas dealt with a machine gun post that was holding up the advance of his company, and won the VC. Having advanced its front by 180 metres (200 yd), the brigade consolidated its positions until it was withdrawn two days later and replaced by units from IX Corps.

At this stage of the war, Braithwaite, a popular commander, was temporarily in charge of the division while Russell was on leave. The last of the brigade commanders who had embarked with the NZEF in 1914, he was worn out and in January was evacuated to England for treatment. On recovery, Braithwaite rejoined his original British Army regiment rather than returning to the division. There were rumours amongst the soldiers of the division that this was a punishment for his refusal to carry on with the 12 October attack at Passchendaele.

By February 1918, the losses in the New Zealand Division resulted in the disbandment of the 4th Brigade. When it was originally formed, New Zealand's prime minister, William Massey, felt that New Zealand was already contributing more than its fair share to the war effort, and he determined that no additional reinforcements would be sent to maintain the brigade; if needed, it would be broken up to supply divisional replacements. Consequently, the brigade's personnel were redistributed amongst the remaining formations to bring them up to strength. The surplus troops formed the 1st, 2nd, and 3rd Entrenching Battalions, one for each brigade, and this provided a pool of trained reinforcements for the division. In other organisational changes, a divisional machine gun battalion was formed from the companies belonging to each brigade while the New Zealand Pioneer Battalion divested itself of its squadron of Otago Mounted Rifles to leave a unit with solely Māori personnel, apart from its senior officers. This was designated the New Zealand Māori (Pioneer) Battalion.

=== Spring Offensive ===
On 21 March, the Germans launched their Spring Offensive which involved 60 divisions advancing across a front of 80 kilometres (50 mi). The Allies were quickly pushed back and a gap formed between the Third and Fifth Armies through which the Germans penetrated. The New Zealand Division was out of the line, recuperating following its tour of duty in the trenches over the winter months, and was deployed to cover a gap which had developed between IV and V Corps at the old Somme battlefield. After moving rapidly to the front, it was positioned at Hamel by 26 March and from there linked up with the 4th Australian Division. For the next several days, the New Zealanders dug in while fending off multiple advances by the Germans. They were initially without artillery support; the infantry had been able to move much more quickly to the front. The artillery began arriving by the evening of 27 March. Supplies took longer to arrive and as rain began to fall on 28 March, many soldiers were without wet weather gear.

The New Zealanders' defensive positions had been improved despite the weather and the harassment from German artillery, which killed Fulton, the original commander of the Rifle Brigade, when a barrage targeted his headquarters. The division undertook the first offensive action by the British forces during the Spring Offensive when three battalions seized the high ground of La Signy farm on 30 March. This success, although relatively trivial to the New Zealanders, was a morale booster for the rest of the beleaguered Third Army.

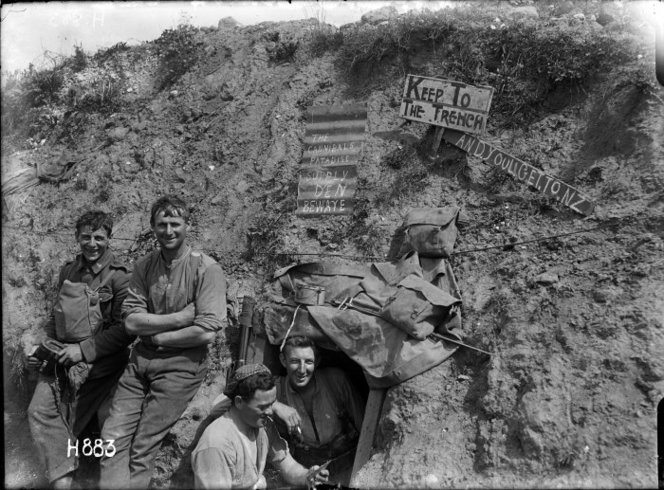
Soldiers with a corrugated iron sign reading 'The Cannibals Paradise Supply Den Beware', 10 August 1918. The sign was created in response to German propaganda that the New Zealanders ate their captured prisoners

The Germans launched a renewed effort to push through to Amiens on 5 April, two armies attacking across the front of the British Third Army. The New Zealanders experienced a heavy bombardment which began at 5:00 am which cut off communications and later that day suffered two separate but disorganised attacks by infantry. The first was fended off but the second recaptured La Signy farm. An attempt to push on to the main trenches of the New Zealanders was rebuffed with heavy losses inflicted by the Wellington Company of the Machine Gun Battalion.

By 9 April, the pressure was decreasing on the New Zealand positions as the Germans shifted their offensive north to the area around Armentières. While the bulk of the New Zealand Division remained on the Somme and consolidated its defences, some of its artillery went to reinforce the British forces bearing the brunt of the renewed German attacks. Casualties for this period of the war were high; nearly 1,000 of the division's personnel were killed through March and April and almost 2,700 were wounded.

The New Zealand Division continued to man its trenches along its section of the Somme front and regularly mounted trench raids. To the amusement of the New Zealanders, the German soldiers manning the trenches opposite were warned to avoid being captured because they might be eaten. In June, the division was withdrawn to Authie. The New Zealanders returned to the Somme front in early July, and settled into a sector east of Hébuterne that included Rossignol Wood. As with the division's previous stint on the Somme, trench raids were often carried out. During a raid mounted on 23 July, Sergeant Richard Travis performed actions that led to a posthumous award of the VC; he was killed the next day. A prominent soldier and renowned for his scouting skills, his death was mourned across the division.

=== Hundred Days' Offensive ===
On 8 August 1918, the last major offensive of the Western Front commenced. It began with an attack by the Canadian and Australian Corps at Amiens, which rolled the German lines back 8 kilometres (5.0 mi) that day. The advance petered out after four days after the Germans began to regroup and shore up their defences. Haig recognised that it was time to put pressure elsewhere on the German front and for this, decided to use General Julian Byng's Third Army. The New Zealand Division would continually be at the forefront of the advance of the Third Army for the remainder of the offensive. At this stage of the war, the New Zealand Division was still one of the strongest infantry divisions of the Dominion serving on the Western Front. It numbered 12,243 men and there were 15,000 reinforcements in England. Aided by the fact that New Zealand introduced conscription in August 1916, the continuous supply of reinforcements prevented it from suffering the reduction in the number of battalions that affected the British and Australian divisions as their manpower reserves dried up. As the division advanced, it usually did so along a brigade-sized front, with three battalions forward of a field artillery brigade. This allowed for rapid artillery support as the need arose. The brigades would leapfrog each other as they moved forward.

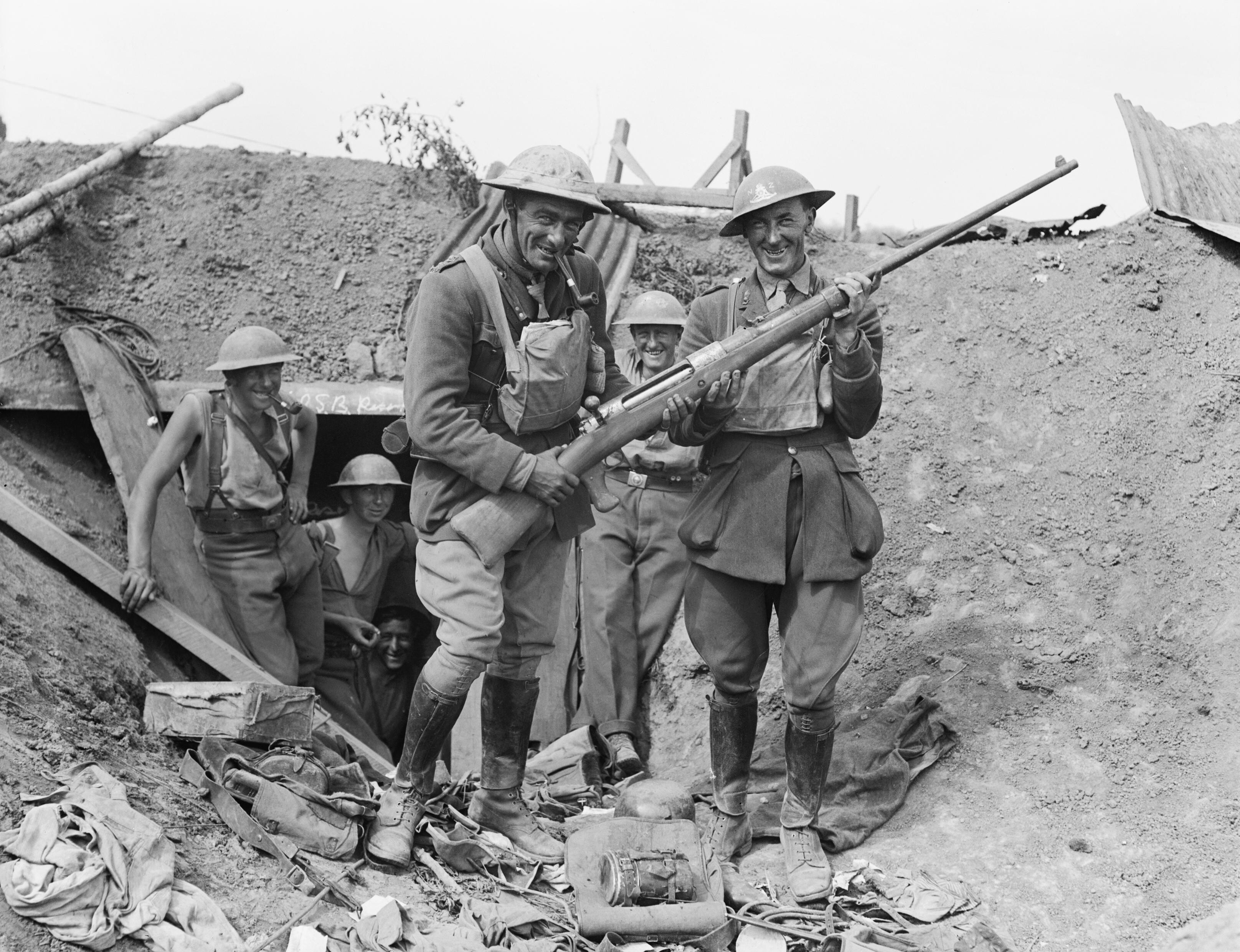
New Zealand gunners with a captured German anti-tank rifle, in a German trench near the village of Grévillers, 26 August 1918

The New Zealand Division's initial involvement in the offensive was on 21 August, when it joined four other divisions of the Third Army in an attack across a 15-kilometre (9.3 mi) front from Puiseux towards the Albert-Arras railway. Its role was relatively minor in this action but a few days afterwards, the division played a significant part in what is now known as the Second Battle of Bapaume. (Note: The battle was fought from 21 August to 2 September; the British Battles Nomenclature Committee designated the fighting that took place from 21 August to 29 August as the Battle of Albert while the Second Battle of Bapaume covered the period 31 August to 3 September.) The battle began on 24 August with a nighttime advance by the 1st and 2nd Brigades to clear the approaches to Bapaume, including Loupart Wood and Grévillers. (Note: Sergeant Samuel Forsyth earned a posthumous VC when he led a party in the capture of a strongpoint that was delaying the advance past Grévillers.) Progress was delayed by heavy machine gun fire and artillery took its toll on supporting tanks. On 29 August, Bapaume itself was captured by the New Zealanders when, after a heavy artillery barrage, they attacked into the town at the same time the Germans were withdrawing. The village of Frémicourt fell the following day.

The New Zealand Division continued to advance, with the 2nd Brigade capturing Haplincourt on 3 September following a failed attempt the previous day. It moved onto the outer defences of the Hindenburg Line, including Trescault Spur, which overlooked the German positions. In conjunction with 37th Division and elements of the 38th Division, the New Zealanders attacked the spur on 12 September. The crest of the spur was captured, although not the trench system on the far side. (Note: During this action, Sergeant Harry Laurent earned the VC for his exploits in leading a patrol that captured a company of Germans.)

After two weeks out of the line, the division attacked the Hindenburg Line itself on 29 September, easily achieving its objectives and capturing 1,000 prisoners. With the New Zealanders on the St. Quentin Canal and the adjacent Scheldt River, a platoon had managed to cross it and reach the village of Crèvecœur. However, it became pinned down until the 1st Auckland and 2nd Wellington Battalions of the 1st Brigade managed to cross the next day and capture the village. (Note: Private James Crichton, a member of the trapped platoon, earned the VC, the last of the war for the New Zealand Division, for his efforts in relaying messages between his companions and his company commander. He also defused demolition charges on the bridge spanning the Scheldt River.)

On 8 October, IV Corps attacked Cambrai, to which the Germans had withdrawn after they abandoned their defences along the St. Quentin Canal. The New Zealand Division's contribution was from the 2nd and Rifle Brigades, both of which easily achieved their objectives. In advance of their flanking units, they were handily placed to intervene when the Germans mounted a counterattack against the adjacent British 2nd Division. By 12 October, the division had advanced nearly 20 kilometres (12 mi), including a crossing of the Selle River, and had captured 1,400 prisoners and 13 field guns. Its own casualties amounted to 536 men. It withdrew from the front line for a brief rest before returning to the front on 20 October.

By the end of October, the New Zealand Division was positioned to the west of the fortified town of Le Quesnoy. On 4 November, the next phase of the Allied advance began with the Battle of the Sambre. The division was tasked with the capture of Le Quesnoy and extending the front line past the town. The Rifle Brigade encircled and, through the achievement of its 4th Battalion in scaling the ramparts that surrounded the town, pushed into Le Quesnoy by the close of the day while the 1st Brigade had established a line to the east. This was the division's most successful day on the Western Front.

The day after the fall of Le Quesnoy, elements of the division moved through the Mormal Forest with the 1st Canterbury and 2nd Otago Battalions of the 2nd Brigade leading the way. As well as covering over 6 kilometres (3.7 mi), they attacked and captured two houses occupied by German forces. Twenty men were killed in this last contact with the enemy, which marked the last offensive action of the division; it was relieved that night. During the Hundred Days' Offensive, it had advanced 100 kilometres (62 mi) in 75 days. It was moving into reserve at Beauvois-en-Cambrésis, in the rear area of IV Corps, when the Armistice was signed on 11 November.

== Occupation duties and disbandment ==
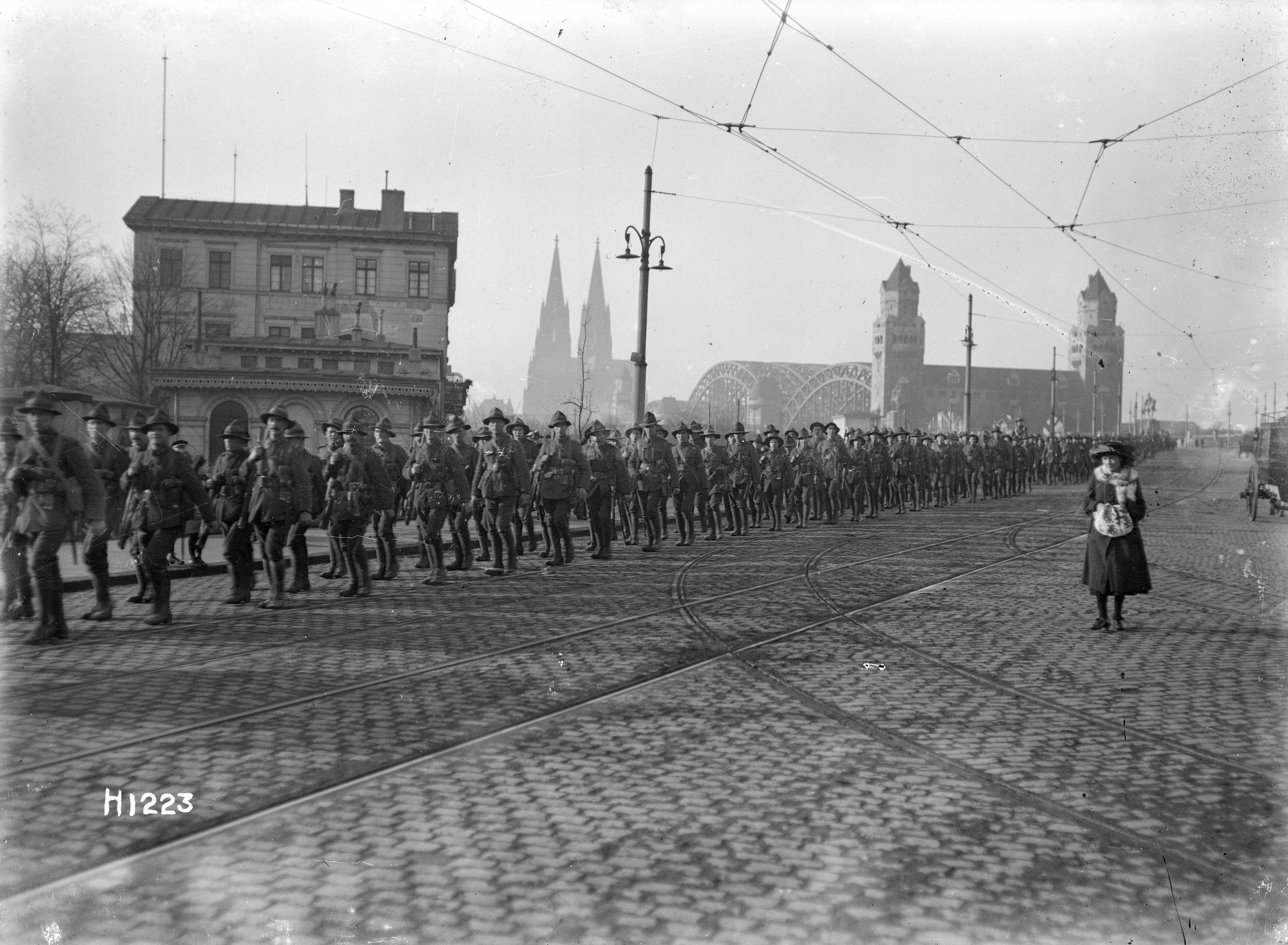
Soldiers of the New Zealand Division marching over the Hohenzollern Bridge, Cologne, Germany

The New Zealand Division was chosen to form part of the Allied occupation force in Germany, to the displeasure of some personnel who had expected to return home. By mid-December it had begun moving through Belgium towards Cologne where it arrived on 20 December. Billeted in the city's suburbs, the division remained on active duty when not sightseeing. Educational programs were also implemented. Demobilisation began towards the end of December with the departure of those who had enlisted in 1914 or 1915. The first unit to leave the division was the Pioneer Battalion, and additional men were sent to England on leave. They remained there until transportation to New Zealand could be arranged. Russell had taken ill in late January and departed for the warmer climate of Southern France, leaving the division's artillery commander, Brigadier General G. Johnston, in charge of the division. The artillery was demobilised on 18 March 1919, with the division formally disbanded on 25 March 1919. Its occupation duties were taken up by the British 2nd Division.

== Memorials ==
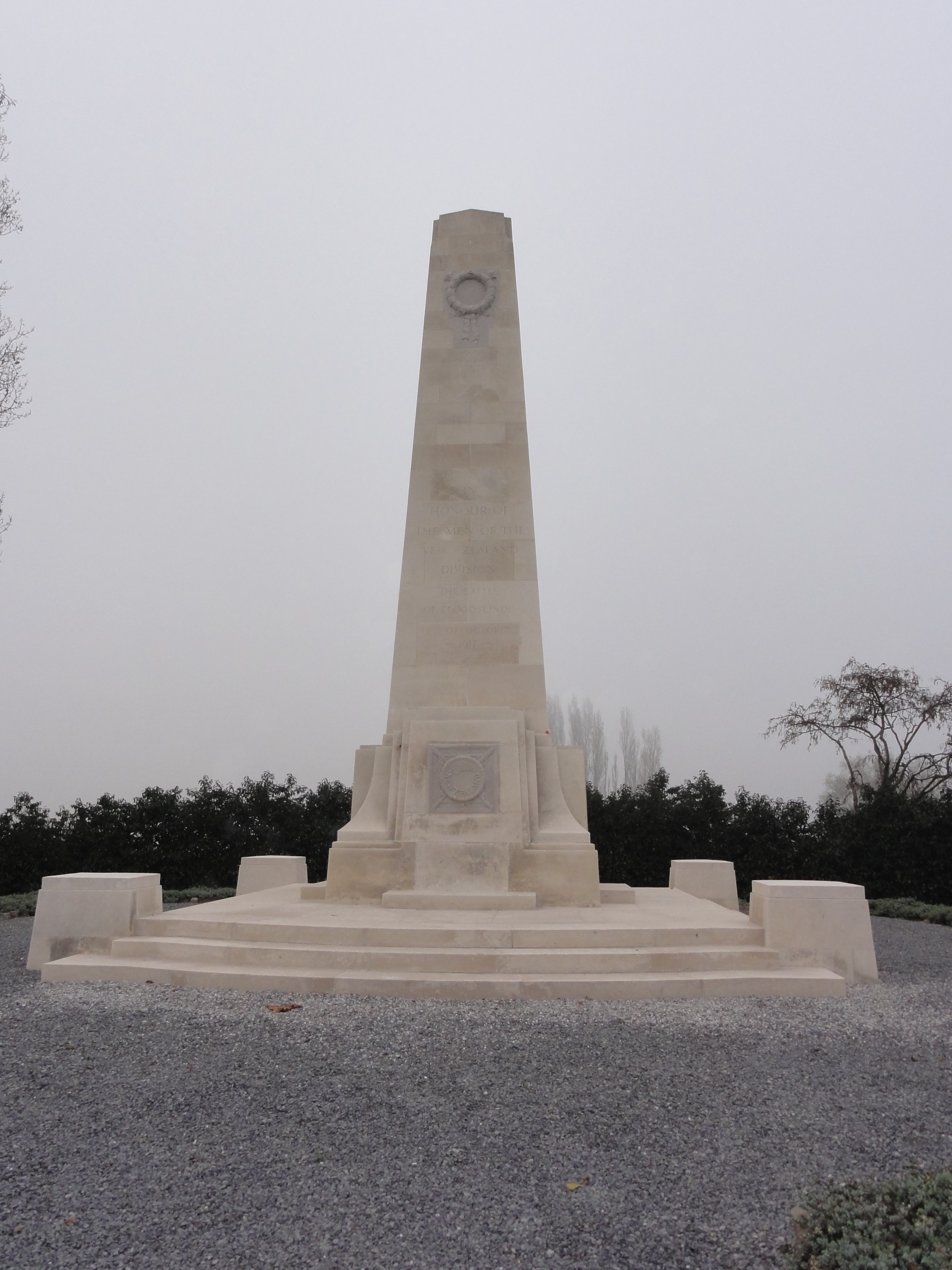
The New Zealand Memorial at Passchendaele, in Belgium

After the war, the New Zealand government instituted four national battlefield memorials to honour the New Zealand soldiers who died on the Western Front. The overwhelming majority of these fatalities, around 12,400, were men from the New Zealand Division. The memorials, designed by Samuel Hurst Seager, are located at Passchendaele, Messines, Le Quesnoy and the Somme. Each memorial includes the words "From the Uttermost Ends of the Earth". In contrast to other Dominions, the names of New Zealand soldiers with no known grave, of which there are about 4,180, are not listed on the Memorials to the Missing at Menin Gate and Thiepval. Instead, it was the policy of the New Zealand government to establish smaller Memorials to the Missing in cemeteries near where the soldiers went missing, one of which is at the Buttes New British Cemetery while another is at the Messines Ridge British Cemetery.

== Notes ==
Footnotes

Citations
