= Henry James Nicholas =

Recipient of the Victoria Cross

Henry James Nicholas VC MM
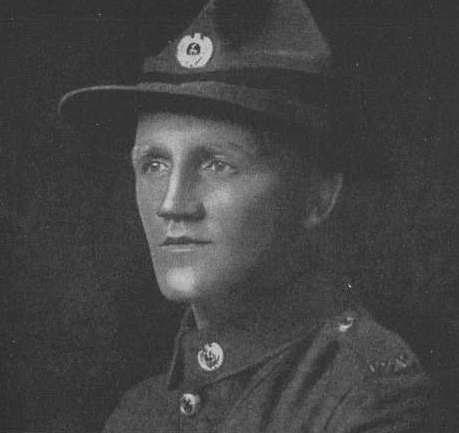
- Born: 11 June 1891; Lincoln, New Zealand
- Died: 23 October 1918 (aged 27) †; Near Le Quesnoy, France
- Military career
- Allegiance: New Zealand
- Branch: New Zealand Military Forces
- Service years: 1915–1918 †
- Rank: Sergeant
- Unit: Canterbury Regiment
- Conflicts: First World War; Battle of Messines; Battle of Passchendaele; Action on the Polderhoek Spur; Hundred Days Offensive
- Awards: Victoria Cross; Military Medal

Henry James Nicholas, VC, MM (11 June 1891 – 23 October 1918) was a New Zealand recipient of the Victoria Cross, the highest award for valour "in the face of the enemy" that can be awarded to British and Commonwealth forces.

Born in Lincoln, Nicholas was a carpenter when he volunteered for service abroad with the New Zealand Expeditionary Force (NZEF) during the First World War. He was posted to the 1st Battalion of the Canterbury Regiment and served on the Western Front. He received the Victoria Cross for his actions during an attack on the Polderhoek Spur on 3 December 1917. He was later awarded the Military Medal for his actions in an engagement during the Hundred Days Offensive. He was killed in action three weeks before the end of the war.

== Early life ==
Nicholas was born in Lincoln, near Christchurch, in New Zealand on 11 June 1891 to Richard and Hannah Nicholas and was one of four boys. He did his schooling in Christchurch, first at Christchurch Normal School and later at Christchurch East School. After completing his education, he took up an apprenticeship to a builder, learning carpentry. He later worked in Australia for four years. On returning to New Zealand in 1915, he joined New Zealand's part-time militia, the Territorial Force, and served in the Field Engineers.

== First World War ==
In February 1916, Nicholas enlisted in the New Zealand Military Forces, giving his occupation as a carpenter. Volunteering for service abroad with the New Zealand Expeditionary Force (NZEF), he embarked for Europe three months later with the 13th Reinforcements. After an initial period at the NZEF training facilities at Sling Camp in England, where he was the regimental boxing champion in the middle-weight class, he was sent to the Western Front and posted to the 1st Battalion of the Canterbury Regiment with the rank of private.

Nicholas' battalion was part of the 2nd Infantry Brigade, New Zealand Division, and in mid-1917 took part in the Battle of Messines. A few months later, the battalion was operating in the Ypres Salient and actively engaged in the Battle of Passchendaele. Towards the end of the year, his battalion was involved in an attack on Polderhoek Chateau on 3 December. The chateau, atop the Polderhoek Spur in the Ypres Salient and held by the Germans, overlooked the trenches occupied by the brigade. Its Canterbury and Otago battalions attacked midday but both were slowed by heavy machine-gun fire. It was then that Nicholas performed the actions that led to the award of the Victoria Cross (VC). The VC, instituted in 1856, was the highest award for valour that could be bestowed on a soldier of the British Empire. His VC citation read as follows:

For most conspicuous bravery and devotion to duty in attack. Private Nicholas, who was one of a Lewis gun section, had orders to form a defensive flank to the right of the advance, which was checked by heavy machine-gun and rifle fire from an enemy strong-point. Whereupon, followed by the remainder of his section at an interval of about 25 yards, Private Nicholas rushed forward alone, shot the officer in command of the strong-point, and overcame the remainder of the garrison of sixteen with bombs and bayonets, capturing four wounded prisoners and a machine-gun. He captured this strong-point practically single-handed, and thereby saved many casualties. Subsequently, when the advance reached its limit, Private Nicholas collected ammunition under heavy machine-gun and rifle fire. His exceptional valour and coolness throughout the operations afforded an inspiring example to all.

— The London Gazette, No. 30472, 11 January 1918

The advance resumed but ground to a halt 140 metres (150 yd) short of the chateau where the New Zealanders established a new front line. During this phase of attack, Nicholas moved along the lines, collecting and distributing ammunition. What was left of the Canterbury and Otago battalions was relieved on 5 December. The award of the VC to Nicholas was gazetted in January 1918. Shortly afterwards, the New Zealand Division was withdrawn from the Ypres sector for a rest, but it was recalled when the Germans launched their Spring Offensive. Nicholas' battalion was dispatched to the Somme on 23 March. Along with the rest of the division it helped stabilise the front until it was placed in reserve in June.

In July Nicholas was sent to England where he was presented with his VC by King George V at an investiture at Buckingham Palace, having been promoted to sergeant the previous month. During the Hundred Days Offensive that commenced later in the year, he was awarded the Military Medal (MM) for actions performed in late September to early October during operations on Welsh and Bon Avis Ridges. On 23 October, he was performing guard duty at a bridge at Beaudignies, near Le Quesnoy when a German patrol encountered his position. He was killed during the ensuing exchange of gunfire. Nicholas was buried in the Vertigneul Churchyard on 29 October, with the visiting Bishop of Nelson officiating. The posthumous award of his MM was gazetted in March 1919, with the citation making note of his "fearless leadership and contempt for danger".

== The Medal ==
Nicholas' VC was presented to his mother by Colonel A. Chaffey, the commander of the Canterbury Military District, in a private ceremony held at her home on Anzac Day, 25 April 1919. She bequeathed the VC, his MM, and his service medals to the Canterbury Museum in 1932, where they remain on display.

== Legacy ==
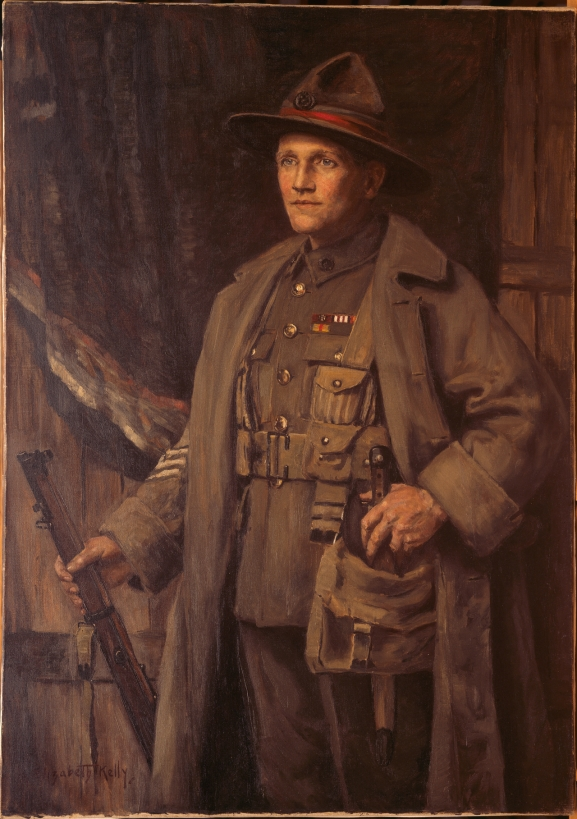
A posthumous portrait of Nicholas, painted in 1920 by Annie Elizabeth Kelly

There are a number of memorials dedicated to Nicholas in New Zealand; he is remembered in the Nicholas family plot in the Bromley Cemetery in Christchurch. Also in the city, a bronze statue with biographical details of Nicholas was erected on the banks of the Avon River on 7 March 2007, near the Bridge of Remembrance. There is also a plaque honouring him in Queen's Garden in Dunedin. In September 2008, a plaque in memory of Nicholas was unveiled by the community of Zonnebeke and the New Zealand Embassy in Brussels, near Geluveld, just southwest of the area where he won the VC.
