= George Johnson (cricketer, born 1894) =

English cricketer

George Henry Johnson was an English cricketer active from 1922 to 1932 who played for Northamptonshire (Northants). He appeared in 18 first-class matches as a wicketkeeper and righthanded batsman. Johnson was born in Middlesbrough on 16 December 1894 and died in Uppingham, Rutland on 20 January 1965. He scored 142 runs with a highest score of 43 not out and claimed twenty victims including six stumpings.
