= George Dean Johnson Jr. =

American politician

Member of the South Carolina House of Representatives for Spartanburg County
- In office 1969–1974

Personal details
- Born: July 22, 1942 (age 84) Columbia, South Carolina
- Party: Republican
- Education: BA from Wofford College in 1964 and JD from University of South Carolina Law School in 1967
- Occupation: lawyer

George Dean Johnson Jr. (born July 22, 1942) is an American politician in the state of South Carolina. He was brought up in Spartanburg. He served in the South Carolina House of Representatives from 1969 to 1974, elected as Democratic, Republican and Independent, representing Spartanburg County, South Carolina. He is a lawyer.

== Business career ==
George D. Johnson Jr. founded multiple companies, including Extended Stay America, Advance America Cash Advance, and Johnson Waste, which was later sold to Waste Management, Incorporated.

He later served on many NYSE publicly traded boards including Extended Stay America, Advance America Cash Advance, AutoNation, Inc., Florida Panthers, Duke Energy Corporation, Morgan Corporation, Inc. Boca Resorts, Viacom, Norfolk Southern Corporation, Home Choice, Inc., Alrenco, Inc., William Barnet & Sons, Inc. and Bankers Trust of South Carolina. Wayne Huizenga was his business partner in the creation of Extended Stay America and later was involved in the creation of a major Blockbuster franchise, which eventually included 208 stores. The pair later merged with Blockbuster, where Johnson was named a company president.
