= George Napier Johnston =

New Zealand general (1867–1947)

Major-General George Napier Johnston CB CMG DSO
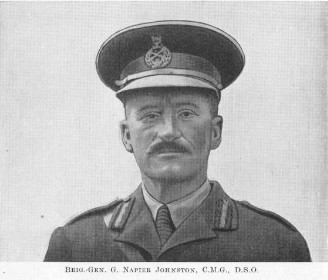
- Portrait of Brigadier-General George Napier Johnston, NZEF
- Born: 2 August 1867; Quebec, Canada
- Died: 3 April 1947 (aged 79); Dar es Salaam, Tanganyika (Tanzania)
- Military career
- Allegiance: United Kingdom
- Branch: British Army; New Zealand Military Forces
- Service years: 1884–1924
- Rank: Major-General
- Conflicts: First World War; Gallipoli campaign; Western Front
- Awards: Companion of the Order of the Bath; Companion of the Order of St Michael and St George; Distinguished Service Order; Mentioned in Despatches (8); Officer of the Legion of Honour (France)

Major-General George Napier Johnston, CB, CMG, DSO (2 August 1867 – 3 April 1947) was a senior officer of the British Army who served with the New Zealand Military Forces during the First World War.

Born in Canada in 1867, Johnston was commissioned in the British Army in 1888. An artillery instructor, he served in British India and in 1904 was placed on secondment with the New Zealand Military Forces for three years before returning to the United Kingdom. He was serving in New Zealand as Inspector of Artillery when the First World War broke out and joined the New Zealand Expeditionary Force (NZEF) that was being raised for service abroad. He served at Gallipoli as commander of the artillery of the New Zealand and Australian Division and fulfilled the same role on the Western Front with the New Zealand Division. During the war he received several decorations in recognition of his war service. He briefly commanded the New Zealand Division while it was stationed in Germany on occupation duty after the war before being discharged from the NZEF. He commanded the artillery of the 52nd (Lowland) Division from 1919 to 1924 before he retired from the British Army. He died in Dar es Salaam in what is now Tanzania at the age of 79.

== Early life ==
George Napier Johnston was born on 2 August 1867 in Quebec, Canada. He entered the Royal Military College of Canada in Kingston, Ontario in 1884 and graduated four years later. After graduating from Kingston, Johnston accepted a commission with the Royal Garrison Artillery of the British Army and for the next ten years served in a variety of postings. In June 1891 he was promoted to lieutenant and was seconded to serve as an adjutant to a unit of Volunteer Artillery. In November 1898 he was promoted to captain.

Johnston had completed a four-year term in India as an artillery instructor when he was seconded to the New Zealand Military Forces in 1904. He served as a staff officer with artillery units for three years before resigning his position to go back to the United Kingdom. Promoted in January 1909 to major, he returned to New Zealand in 1911 to serve as Director of Artillery.

== First World War ==
At the commencement of the First World War, Johnston was a major and Inspector of the Artillery. In response to the outbreak of the war in Europe, the New Zealand government authorised the raising of the New Zealand Expeditionary Force (NZEF) for war service overseas. Johnston was appointed commander of the Field Artillery Brigade and embarked from Wellington with the main body of the NZEF in October 1914. The NZEF was intended for service on the Western Front, but following the entry of Turkey into the war it was diverted to Egypt while in transit.

=== Gallipoli ===
When the New Zealand and Australian Division was formed in 1915, Johnston was appointed commander of its artillery. This only consisted of a single brigade of 16 guns, including four howitzers, much less than the normal divisional complement of artillery. Despite the lack of guns and ammunition, his work with the artillery was highly regarded during the Gallipoli Campaign. In October 1915, prior to the Allied evacuation from Gallipoli, he was made a temporary brigadier-general.

=== Western Front ===
On establishment of the New Zealand Division in 1916 Johnston was appointed commander of its artillery and promoted to lieutenant-colonel while retaining his temporary rank of brigadier-general. The division deployed to France in April 1916 and his artillery spent a period in the Armentieres sector supporting the division's infantry during trench raids. Two months after arriving in France he was appointed to the Distinguished Service Order (DSO) for services in the field. In September 1916 the divisional artillery saw extensive action during the Battle of the Somme. It supporting the troops for 56 consecutive days during the Somme battle by providing well coordinated barrages and counter fire which helped the infantry to take the majority of their objectives. This feat owed much to the proficiency of Johnston, who was awarded the Croix de Officier of the Légion d'honneur in May 1917. This French award is uncommon to New Zealanders: fewer than 100 awards have been made, and Johnston was one of only 14 members of the New Zealand Military Forces to be decorated with the Legion of Honour during the war.

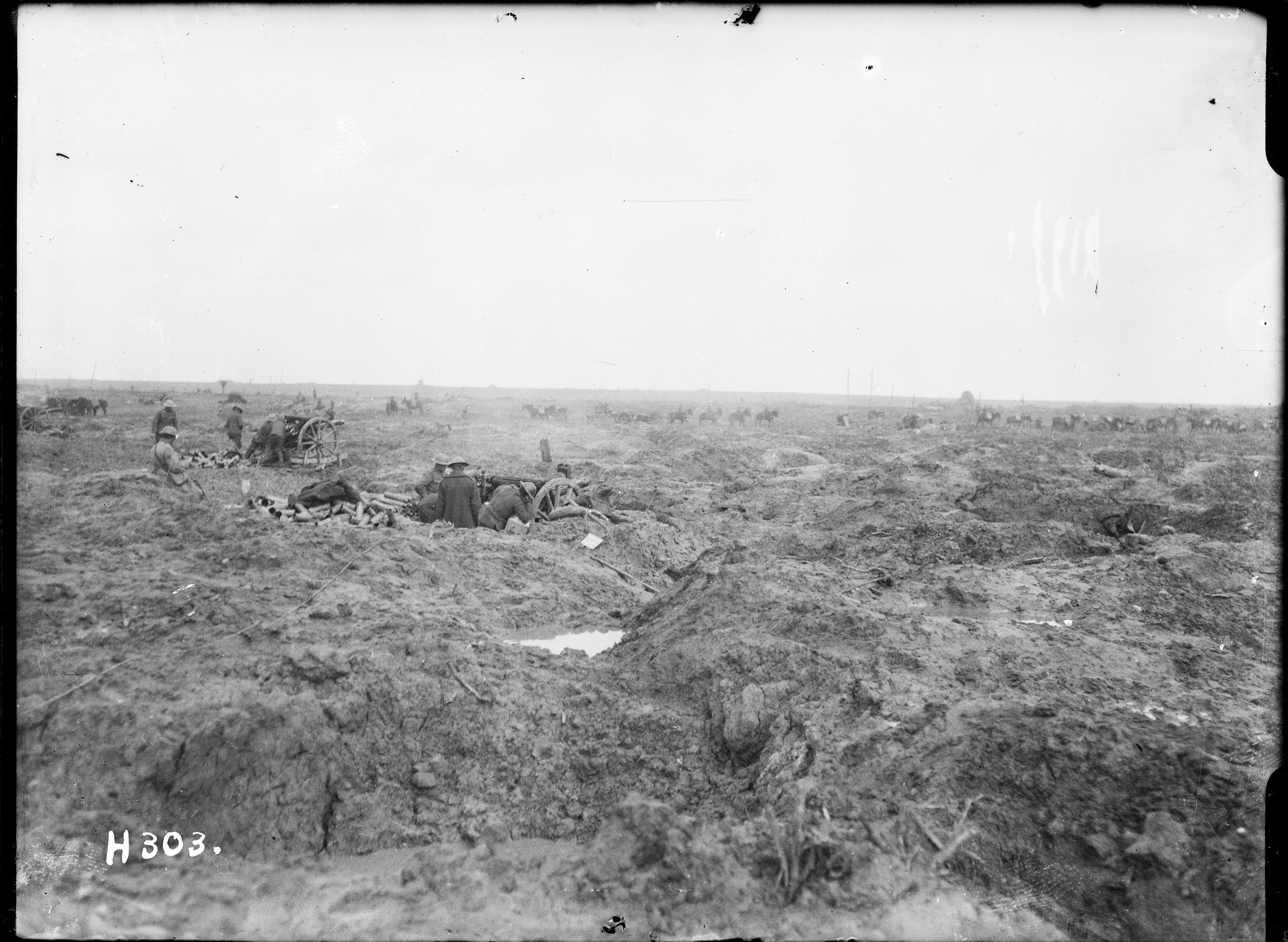
New Zealand artillery in action during the Battle of Broodseinde, 12 October 1917

Johnston's artillery performed well during the Battle of Messines and in the early stages of the Third Battle of Ypres, overcoming difficult conditions during the New Zealand Division's attack at Broodseinde on 4 October 1917. As ground conditions continued to deteriorate in the days leading up to the First Battle of Passchendaele, Johnston warned the commander of the division, Major-General Andrew Russell, that his artillery were not adequately prepared. Mud had affected the positioning of his artillery and prevented sufficient supplies of ammunition getting through to his guns. When the division attacked on 12 October, it failed to fulfil its key objectives.

During the Hundred Days' Offensive, which began in August 1918, the nature of the fighting changed from relatively static trench combat to more mobile and open warfare as the Germans retreated in the face of Allied advances. Consequently, Johnston had to alter his tactics and use of artillery. He devised a command structure whereby his artillery batteries were attached to advancing infantry and, under the command of a senior officer at brigade headquarters, would move forward in a staggered fashion to provide continued fire support as the division advanced. The artillery of adjacent British divisions were relatively static in comparison and not as able to support rapid forward movement.

By the end of the war, Johnston had been mentioned in despatches eight times and appointed a Companion of the Order of St Michael and St George. In early 1919 he was promoted to temporary major-general and commanded the New Zealand Division while it was stationed in Germany on occupation duty. He oversaw the disbandment of the division later that year. Discharged from the NZEF, he rejoined the British Army.

== Later life ==
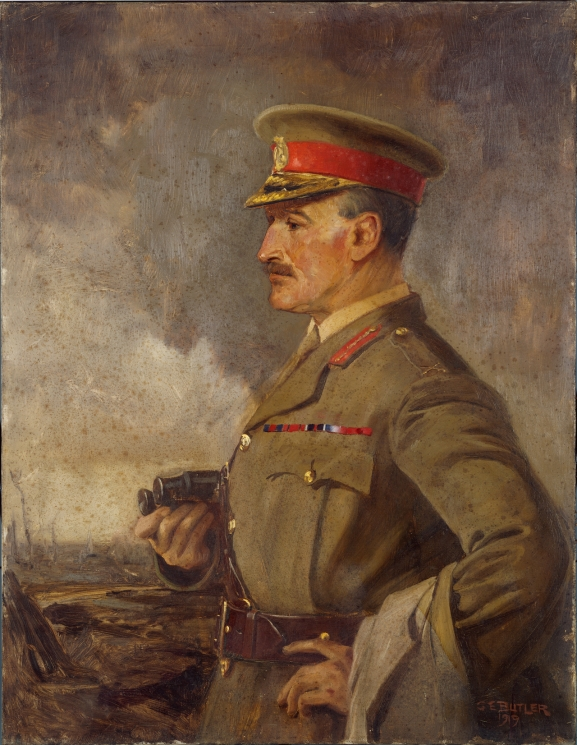
A portrait of Johnston, painted by George Edmund Butler in 1919

On his return to the British Army, Johnston reverted to his substantive rank of lieutenant colonel and was appointed Commander, Royal Artillery, 52nd (Lowland) Division. Promoted to the substantive rank of colonel in April 1920, he remained with the division until his retirement from the military in April 1924 with the honorary rank of brigadier general. While serving with the 52nd Division he contributed an introduction to the history of the New Zealand Artillery during the First World War, and was also made a Companion of the Order of the Bath.

He died at the age of 79 on 3 April 1947 in Dar es Salaam in Tanganyika (now Tanzania).
