= Chief Johnson totem pole =

Totem pole in Ketchikan, Alaska, US

Coordinates: 55°20′31″N 131°38′34″W

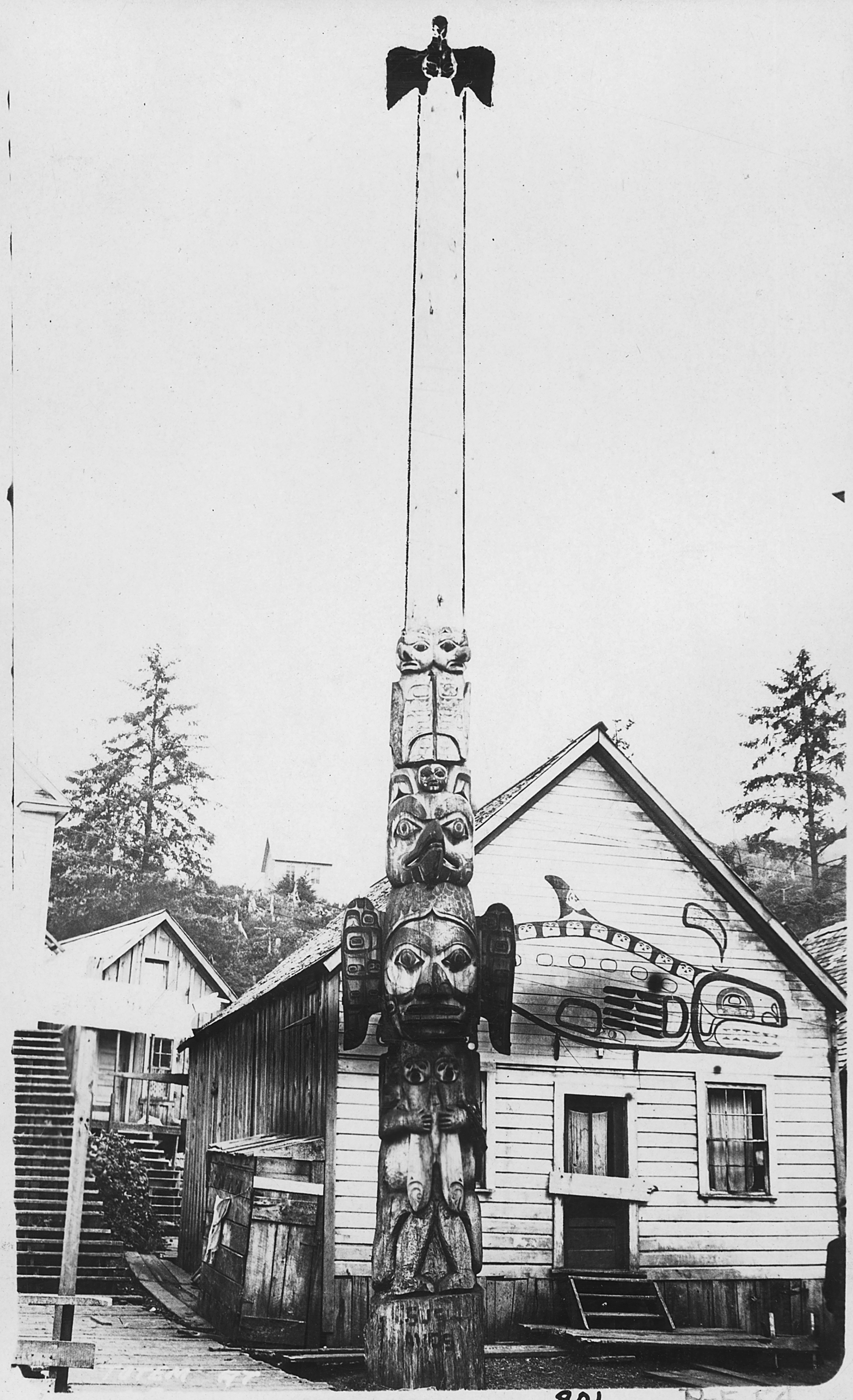
The original totem pole, created in 1902

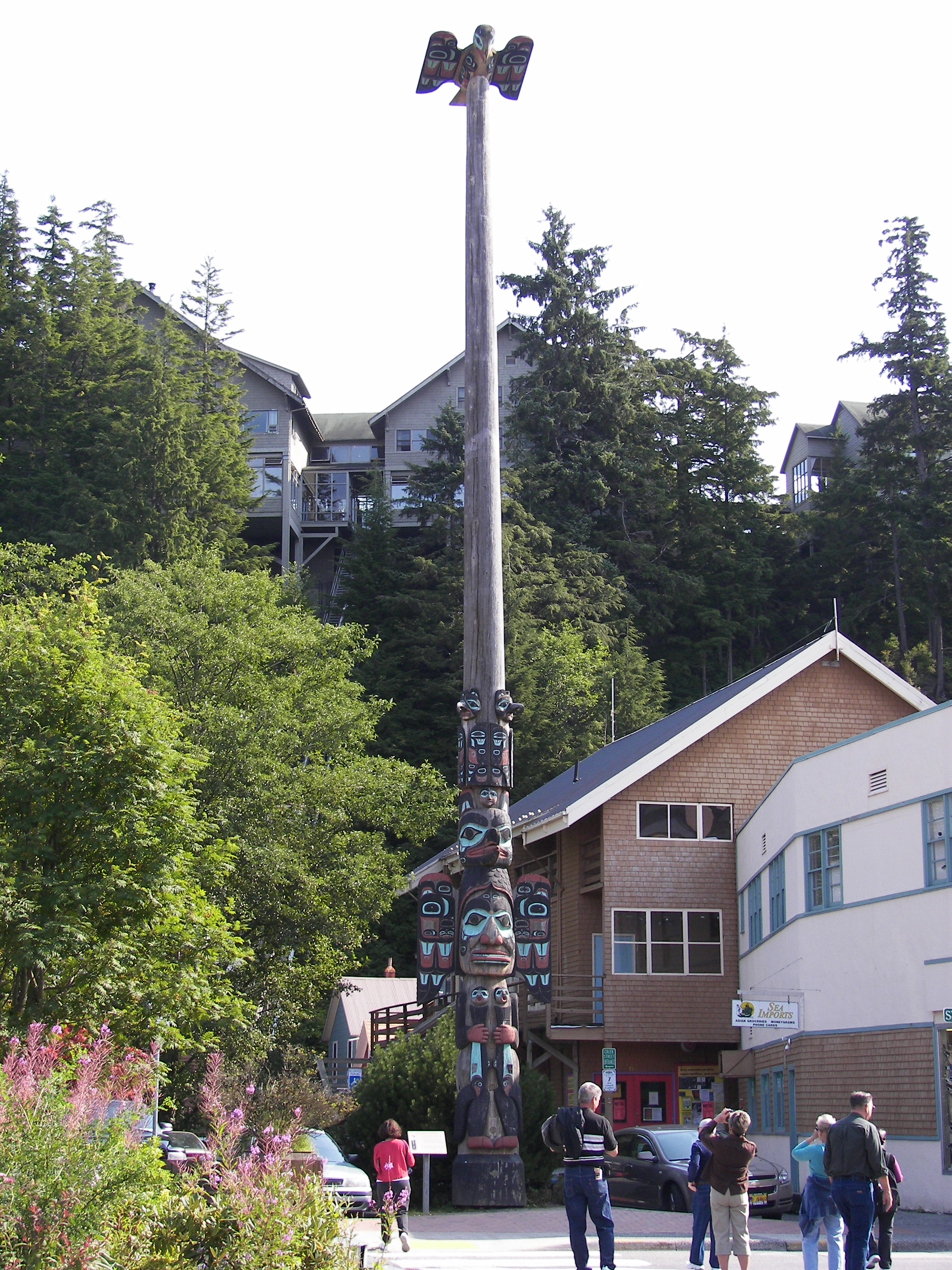
The modern totem pole, created in 1989

The Chief Johnson totem pole (also known as the Kadjuk Pole) is a totem pole of the Tongass tribe of the Tlingit people located in Ketchikan, Alaska. The pole was first commissioned by Chief George Johnson and carved in 1902 before deteriorating and being taken down in 1982. The pole was recreated in 1989 and carved by Israel Shotridge (Kinstaádaál) and has since seen regular restorations. The Chief Johnson totem pole is described as being the most photographed totem pole in Alaska.

== History ==
The pole was initially created in 1902 under commission from Chief George Johnson, who was the head of the Drifting Ashore House (Yan Wulihashi Hít) of the Tongass tribe. It was carved to honor the death of Johnson's mother. The original pole was made of yellow cedar and penetrated 18 feet (5.5 m) into the ground, which contributed to it being damaged by water. The pole was taken down in 1982 due to its deteriorated state. The original pole remains in storage at the Totem Heritage Center.

The pole was recreated in 1989 to signify the original settlement of the Tongass tribe. It was carved by Israel Shotridge (Kinstaádaál), a member of the Bear clan of the Tongass tribe, to honor the Raven clan of the tribe. The modern pole does not penetrate the ground like the previous one but rather is mounted on a creosote log above ground. The dedication ceremony of the new pole was attended by 1,200 people from nearby villages, and a day-long ku.éex’ celebration was held. The pole has been restored in 1992 and 2018. According to art historian Lauren Kilroy-Ewbank, the Chief Johnson totem pole is the most photographed totem pole in Alaska; historian Alison Hoagland has described it as "most notable" in Ketchikan.

== Description ==
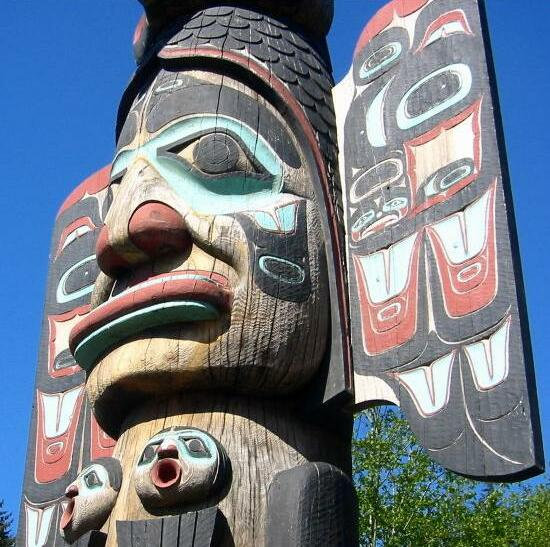
Detail of Fog Woman's face on the pole

The Chief Johnson totem pole stands 55 feet (17 m) tall, with 33 feet (10 m) of it remaining uncarved. The uncarved space serves to acknowledge the significance of the golden eagle, or Kadjuk, carved on the very top of the pole, which is an emblem of the Raven clan of the Tongass tribe. The pole depicts figures of the trickster Raven, his two slaves, his wife Fog Woman, and sockeye salmon. It tells the story of Raven and the Fog Woman, which says that Fog Woman created a bounty of sockeye salmon for Raven to eat, but took them back after he became disrespectful and struck her. The story says that Fog Woman walks through rivers each year and that salmon follow her to feed the Tlingit people. The modern pole is made from a western red cedar log.

The pole is located on the intersection between Totem Way and Steadman Street, in the center of Ketchikan.
