= George Johnson (cricketer, born 1907) =

English cricketer

George James Johnson was an English cricketer active from 1929 to 1935 who played for Northamptonshire (Northants). He appeared in five first-class matches as a righthanded batsman who bowled right arm fast. Johnson was born in Loddington, Northamptonshire on 23 December 1907 and died in Market Harborough, Leicestershire on 9 June 1986. He scored 49 runs with a highest score of 28 not out and took five wickets with a best performance of two for 41.
