= George Johnson (footballer, born 1907) =

English footballer

Personal information
- Full name: George Johnson
- Date of birth: 6 January 1907
- Place of birth: Newcastle-on-Tyne, England
- Date of death: February 1989 (aged 82)
- Place of death: Fulham, England
- Height: 5 ft 10 1/2 in (1.79 m)
- Position: Full back

Senior career*
Years	Team	Apps	(Gls)
1925–1926	Wigan Borough	3	(0)
1926	Walker Celtic		
1926–1927	Darlington	2	(0)
1927–1930	Chelsea		
–	Northfleet		
- * Club domestic league appearances and goals

George Johnson (6 January 1907 – February 1989) was an English footballer who played as a full back in the Football League for Wigan Borough and Darlington.

Johnson made his Football League debut on 3 October 1925, as Wigan Borough lost 3–1 away to Southport. He played twice more in the Third Division North, both defeats, before leaving the club and returning to his native north-east of England. He spent time with Walker Celtic before signing for Darlington, for whom he played twice in the Second Division. In the 1927 close season, he signed for Chelsea. He was retained for at least two more seasons, but retired at end of 1929/30 season. but never played first-team football for the club. He went on to play non-league football for Northfleet, and worked as a bus driver in London.
