= George Johnstone (Australian footballer) =

Australian rules footballer

Personal information
- Full name: George Johnstone
- Born: 4 November 1869
- Died: 9 November 1956 (aged 87)
- Original team: Coranderrk

Playing career^{1}
Years	Club	Games (Goals)
1897–1898	Melbourne	8 (0)
- ^{1} Playing statistics correct to the end of 1898.

George Johnston (4 November 1869 – 9 November 1956) was an Australian rules footballer who played with Melbourne in the Victorian Football League (VFL).
