= George Johnston (Australian footballer) =

Australian rules footballer

Personal information
- Full name: George Henry Johnston
- Nickname: Cheerful
- Born: 12 February 1877; Sandridge, Victoria
- Died: 11 August 1945 (aged 68); Hobart, Tasmania
- Original team: Albert Park

Playing career^{1}
Years	Club	Games (Goals)
1897	Carlton (VFL)	1 (0)
1899-1900	Prahran (VFA)	22 (2)
- ^{1} Playing statistics correct to the end of 1900.

Career highlights
- Inaugural team captain: Prahran (VFA) 1899.

George Henry Johnston (12 February 1877 – 11 August 1945) was an Australian rules footballer who played with Carlton in its first-ever match (1897) in the Victorian Football League (VFL) competition, and with Prahran in its first-ever match (1899) in the Victorian Football Association (VFA) competition.

== Family ==
The son of John Johnston (1836-1888), and Susannah Johnston (1844-1914), née Knight, George Henry Johnston was born in Sandridge, Victoria on 12 February 1877.

He married Edith Florence Button (1873-1933) in 1900. They had four children.

== Football ==
=== Carlton (VFL) ===
Recruited from the Albert Park Football Club, Johnston only played once for the Carlton Football Club: against Fitzroy, at the Brunswick Street Oval, on 8 May 1987, in the first-ever round of the new Victorian Football League (VFL) competition. Three weeks later he was cleared back to Albert Park.

=== Prahran (VFA) ===
Recruited from Albert Park, Johnston played in the first-ever match that Prahran played on its re-entry into the VFA — against Richmond, at Toorak Park, on 6 May 1899 — at full-back, and as the team's captain. He played in 17 matches (scoring 1 goal) in 1899, and in 5 matches (scoring 1 goal) in 1900.

=== Recognition ===
He was a Life Member of both the Prahran Football Club and the Victorian Football Association.

== Military service ==
He enlisted in the First AIF in November 1915. He served overseas, and was wounded in action twice: in 1917, and in 1918.

== Death ==
He died at the Repatriation General Hospital, Hobart, on 11 August 1945.
