= George Johnson (football manager) =

English football manager

Managerial career
- Years: Team
- 1898–1912: Leicester City

George Johnson was a football manager.

He was manager of Leicester City from 1898 to 1 January 1907. He was in charge for 7 seasons and a total 301 games, he was victorious in 114 of these and lost 115 times.
