= Battle of Guillemont =

World War I battle

Coordinates: 50°0′49.6″N 2°49′28″E

- Part of The Battle of the Somme of the First World War
- Battle of the Somme 1 July – 18 November 1916
Date	3–6 September 1916
Location	Guillemont, France
Result	British victory

Belligerents
British Empire: United Kingdom; France	German Empire

Commanders and leaders
(United Kingdom of Great Britain and Ireland) Douglas Haig (French Third Republic) Ferdinand Foch (United Kingdom of Great Britain and Ireland) Henry Rawlinson (French Third Republic) Émile Fayolle	(German Empire) (Kingdom of Bavaria) Crown Prince Rupprecht of Bavaria (German Empire) Max von Gallwitz (German Empire) Fritz von Below

Strength
6 divisions	

The Battle of Guillemont (3–6 September 1916) was an attack, during the Battle of the Somme in the First World War, by the British Fourth Army against the German 2nd Army near the village of Guillemont in northern France. The village is on the D 20 running east to Combles and the D 64 south-west to Montauban. Longueval and Delville Wood lie to the north-west and Ginchy to the north-east. The village was on the right flank of the British sector, near the boundary with the French Sixth Army. The Fourth Army had advanced close to Guillemont during the Battle of Bazentin Ridge (14–17 July) and the capture of the village was the culmination of British attacks which began on the night of 22/23 July. The attacks were intended to advance the right flank of the Fourth Army and eliminate a salient further north at Delville Wood. German defences ringed the wood and had observation over the French Sixth Army area to the south, towards the Somme river.

Preparatory to a general attack intended for mid-September, from the Somme north to Courcelette (beyond the Albert–Bapaume road), the French Sixth Army, the Fourth Army and the Reserve Army conducted numerous attacks to capture the rest of the German second line and to gain observation over the German third line. The German defences around Guillemont were based on the remaining parts of the second line and fortified villages and farms northwards from Hem, Maurepas and Combles, to Falfemont Farm, Guillemont, Ginchy, Delville Wood and High Wood, which commanded the ground in between. The Battles Nomenclature Committee report of May 1921, called British military operations on the Somme during the fighting for Guillemont, the Battle of Delville Wood (14 July – 3 September) by the Fourth Army and the Battle of Pozières (23 July – 3 September) by the Reserve Army and III Corps of the Fourth Army.

Attempts were made by Joseph Joffre, the French supreme commander, Sir Douglas Haig, Ferdinand Foch and the army commanders Henry Rawlinson and Émile Fayolle to co-ordinate attacks, which failed due to the recovery of the German 2nd Army from the disorganisation caused by the defeats in early July, disagreements over tactics by Haig and Joffre in July and August and organisational constraints caused by congestion behind the front, roads and tracks obliterated by Anglo-French artillery-fire becoming swamps when it rained. Increasing German artillery-fire on targets behind the front line, inexperience, unreliable machinery, guns, ammunition and an unpredictable flow of supplies from Britain, reduced the effectiveness of the British armies. Difficulty in co-ordinating attacks by the Entente armies and the large number of piecemeal attacks resorted to by the British, have been criticised as costly failures and evidence of muddle and incompetence by the generals. The French Sixth and Tenth armies had similar difficulties and severe strain had been put on the German 2nd Army and the 1st Army (formed on 19 July), forcing them into a similar piecemeal defence.

The official historian, Wilfrid Miles, wrote in the History of the Great War volume (1938), that the defence of Guillemont was judged by some observers to be the best performance of the war by the German Army on the Western Front. A pause at the end of August in Anglo-French attacks to organise bigger combined attacks and postponements for bad weather, coincided with the largest German counter-attack yet. Joffre, Foch and Haig abandoned attempts to organise large combined attacks, in favour of sequenced army attacks. The capture of the German defences from Cléry north of the Somme to Guillemont from 3 to 6 September brought the Sixth and Fourth armies onto ground which overlooked the German third position. Rain, congestion and relief of tired divisions forced a pause in French attacks until 12 September. At the Battle of Ginchy (9 September) the Fourth Army captured the village, ready to begin the Battle of Flers–Courcelette, (15–22 September).

== Background ==
=== Strategic developments ===
On 1 July, the Anglo-French offensive had captured the first German defensive line from Foucaucourt south of the Somme to the vicinity of the Albert–Bapaume road, north of the river. (Note: Despite the certainty by mid-June of an Anglo-French attack on the Somme against the 2nd Army, Falkenhayn sent only four divisions, keeping eight in the western strategic reserve. No divisions were moved from the 6th Army, despite it holding a shorter line with 17 1/2 divisions and three of the Westheer reserve divisions in its area. The maintenance of the strength of the 6th Army, at the expense of the 2nd Army, indicated that Falkehnayn intended the counter-offensive against the British to be made north of the Somme front, once the British offensive had been shattered.) The German 2nd Army abandoned the second line on the south bank in the XVII Corps area, to occupy the shorter third position behind it close to Péronne, despite the policy of an unyielding defence. The Chief of Staff, Generalmajor Paul Grünert, was sacked by Falkenhayn that night and replaced by Colonel Fritz von Loßberg. (Note: Falkenhayn implied after the war that the psychology of German soldiers, shortage of manpower and lack of reserves made the policy inescapable, since the troops necessary to seal off breakthroughs did not exist. High losses caused by unyielding defence were preferable to worse losses in open warfare and the effect of a belief that soldiers had discretion to avoid battle. When a more flexible policy was substituted in September, decisions about withdrawal were still reserved for army commanders.) Next day Below issued a secret order that ground must be held at all costs, defensive positions were to be recovered by counter-attacks and that all commanders must make it clear that "The enemy must be made to pick his way forward over corpses". Over the next ten days, fifteen fresh divisions were sent to the Somme front, being split up as they arrived and used piecemeal to fill gaps at the most vulnerable points, which led to many casualties in the reinforcing units. The 2nd Army suffered 40,187 casualties in the first ten days, compared to 25,989 men in the first ten days at Verdun.

On 17 July, Falkenhayn reorganised the twenty German divisions engaged on the Somme, by re-establishing the 1st Army under the command of Below, north of the Somme and appointing Lieutenant-General Max von Gallwitz to the command of the 2nd Army south of the river, combining both armies in armeegruppe Gallwitz-Somme. On 17 July, Below issued another secret order, noting that unauthorised withdrawals were still being made and threatened to Court-martial commanders who did not fight to the last man. By the end of July, despite the discipline and sacrifice of the German troops, more ground had been lost and Gallwitz issued an order on 30 July, stating that the decisive battle of the war was being fought on the Somme and that no more ground should be given up, regardless of losses. In August, the Germans retained far more ground than in July, at a cost of c. 80,000 casualties. (Note: The German army made at least 330 attacks against the British during the Battle of the Somme.)

On 6 July, Joffre had visited Fayolle and discussed bringing the cavalry close to the front to exploit success and on 8 July, Foch, commander of Groupe d'armées du Nord (GAN, Northern Army Group), ordered Fayolle to reinforce the success of the corps south of the Somme for an attack on 20 July, while defending north of the river. After the British victory of the Battle of Bazentin Ridge (14 to 22 July), Joffre directed Foch to co-ordinate broad-front attacks with the British, who were making the main effort, to force the Germans to spread their artillery-fire and infantry over a wider front. Foch ordered the attack to be extended north of the river, although the transfer of artillery had put the main weight of the attack on the south side. In mid-July, the British Expeditionary Force (BEF) General Headquarters (GHQ) received intelligence reports of "demoralisation and confusion" among the German defenders but recovery was noted within three days, particularly due to improvements in the flow of supplies to the German front line.

By the end of July, there was no expectation of a rapid German collapse, as the defenders north of the Somme had been relieved by three times as many fresh divisions and the Fourth Army was ordered to prepare for a German counter-attack. Intelligence reports showed very high German casualties and that one of the fresh German divisions had previously lost 104 per cent of its infantry strength at Verdun. A copy of the order issued by Below for unyielding defence was captured in late July, which indicated that German tactics were making attrition a feasible Entente objective. The destruction of British intelligence networks in occupied northern France and Belgium restricted GHQ Intelligence to gleaning documents from the battlefield and prisoner interrogation, causing the number of German divisions available for the Somme front to be underestimated. On 2 August, Haig issued a directive stating that Falkenhayn could continue to replace troops on the Somme and a German collapse was not expected, forecasting a "wearing-out" battle until September. Anglo-French intelligence estimates of German casualties ranged from 130,000–175,000 men in July.

After another general relief of German divisions in mid-August, reports of "despondency" among prisoners, an estimate that the British had engaged 23 of the 41 German divisions which had fought on the Somme, which were exhausted after 4 1/2 days, yet kept in the line for twenty; news of German peace feelers and mounting domestic unrest raised Allied optimism again. At the end of August, the Rumanian declaration of war and the sacking of Falkenhayn led to hopes that his replacement by Generalfeldmarschall (Field Marshal) Paul von Hindenburg as Chief of the General Staff and General Erich Ludendorff as erster Generalquartiermeister (First Quartermaster General) would lead to more emphasis on the eastern front, easing the task of the Entente armies in France and Belgium. The advances in early September and the publication of German casualty lists for July (which showed that seven of the twelve German divisions on the Somme opposite the British had lost more than 50 per cent of their infantry) encouraged Haig and Joffre to persist with the offensive. Bavarian units in the area around Guillemont were believed to have maintained high morale but suffered many casualties and had few reserves available.

=== Tactical developments ===
Weather (14–31 July 1916)
Date	Rain mm	°F	
14	0.0	—	dull
15	0.0	72°–47°	sun
16	4.0	73°–55°	dull
17	0.0	70°–59°	mist
18	0.0	72°–52°	dull
19	0.0	70°–50°	dull
20	0.0	75°–52°	fine
21	0.0	72°–52°	fine
22	0.1	77°–55°	dull
23	0.0	68°–54°	dull
24	0.0	70°–55°	dull hot
25	0.0	66°–50°	dull
26	0.0	66°–50°	dull
27	8.0	81°–61°	hazy
28	0.0	77°–59°	dull hot
29	0.0	81°–57°	dull
30	0.0	82°–57°	fine
31	0.0	82°–59°	hot

A vast increase in British war production had been achieved in 1916 but the flow of equipment and ammunition caused transport problems in France, particularly on the Chemins de Fer du Nord (Nord) railways, which had become overloaded by the increase in the size of the BEF, the large number ammunition trains from the Channel ports to the Somme front and the need to move unprecedented numbers of casualties after 1 July. Congestion of the railways began to affect operations in July and rainy periods made delivery of ammunition from railheads to gun positions much harder, when 550 lorry-loads were being delivered even on quiet days. Shortages of heavy howitzer ammunition in mid-July were made worse in areas under German observation and harassing-fire, as more German artillery arrived on the Somme front.

After 1 July, work began on extensions of the railway mainline behind the Somme front towards Maricourt and the metre-gauge line from Albert to Bray was extended to Fricourt and Montauban by 14 July. Anglo-French conferences on railway policy on 15 and 18 June settled administrative questions on railway building, line extensions and the building of all-weather connecting roads. Operation of the extensions proved difficult, due to the number of soldiers, lorries, wagons and guns criss-crossing the rear of the battlefront and road closures due to accidents and German bombardments, which made the delivery of supplies unpredictable.

From 1 to 11 July, the XIII Corps artillery (357 guns), received 77 guns to replace 65 which were out of action due to defects and lack of spare parts; the supply of ammunition was adequate but much of it was of poor quality, fuzes from heavy howitzer shells falling out in flight. On 31 July, Rawlinson concentrated the artillery of XIII Corps on the right flank against Guillemont and then a line from Leuze Wood to Ginchy, with assistance from the XV Corps artillery. On 3 August, the British Armies received a directive from Haig, which laid down the methods to be adopted to capture all of the Morval–Thiepval ridge, as it was clear that the German defence had become more formidable.

Methodical preparation of small attacks, with immediate consolidation was required and great economy of men and equipment was necessary, to conduct another general attack in mid-September. The French XX Corps was to be assisted by the capture of Falfemont Farm, Leuze Wood, Guillemont and Ginchy. Rawlinson altered the XIII Corps boundary, to concentrate it against Guillemont; the 55th (West Lancashire) Division and the 2nd Division sapped forward to reduce the width of no man's land, which brought the British front line to Arrow Head Copse and about half-way from Trônes Wood to Guillemont.

The two German armies on the Somme made corps headquarters permanent geographical entities, with divisions temporarily attached, before relief by fresh formations. On the south bank, Gruppe von Quast was formed from the XVII Reserve Corps. Eventually the area north of the Somme to the Ancre was held by Gruppe Gossler (VI Reserve Corps) from the Somme to Hardecourt, Sixt von Armin (IV Corps) from Hardecourt to Pozières on the Albert–Bapaume road and Gruppe von Stein (XIV Reserve Corps) from Pozières, across the Ancre to Gommecourt. (Note: Gossler and the VI Reserve Corps had been engaged at Verdun.) On 2 July, Loßberg surveyed the battlefield near Péronne, then began to arrange defensive positions like those used in the Second Battle of Champagne in September 1915. Front-line positions were to be thinly held, maintained regardless of loss and recaptured by Gegenstöße (immediate counter-attacks). If a Gegenstöß failed, Gegenangriffe (organised counter-attacks) were to be made.

Loßberg ordered a new telephone line to be built, parallel to the front line, out of artillery range, with branches to forward headquarters, ordered artillery headquarters to move close to infantry division headquarters to improve liaison and moved artillery observation posts back from the front line to positions which overlooked it. Lack of reserves was the chief difficulty of the defence and Loßberg urged Falkenhayn to end the Battle of Verdun to supply reinforcements; for as long as German attacks continued at Verdun, troops, supplies and equipment arrived on the Somme intermittently, forcing piecemeal reinforcement of weak spots by battalions and companies, rather than complete units from a settled echelon of reserves, which caused irreplaceable losses in divisions kept in the line for too long.

German infantry began to avoid trench lines in mid-July and occupied shell-holes, which made Allied bombardments less effective and diverted infantry into mopping-up operations. Allied attacks on limited objectives reduced the effectiveness of German defensive dispersal, positions were incessantly bombarded, trenches, barbed wire and dugouts disappearing as far back as the second line. Shell-hole positions about 20 yd (18 m) apart, containing two or three men were quickly overrun by Anglo-French infantry and prepared for defence, before a Gegenstöß could be made. Deliberate counter-attacks (Gegenangriffe) were planned but most were cancelled due to shortages of troops, artillery and ammunition. Attempts to connect shell-hole positions during quiet periods failed, because Allied air reconnaissance quickly directed artillery-fire onto them. Trenches were evacuated before attacks, which began the development of defended areas, in which small groups manoeuvred to deprive Allied gunners of recognisable targets, vastly inflating the amount of ammunition necessary for bombardments.

== Prelude ==
=== Anglo-French preparations ===
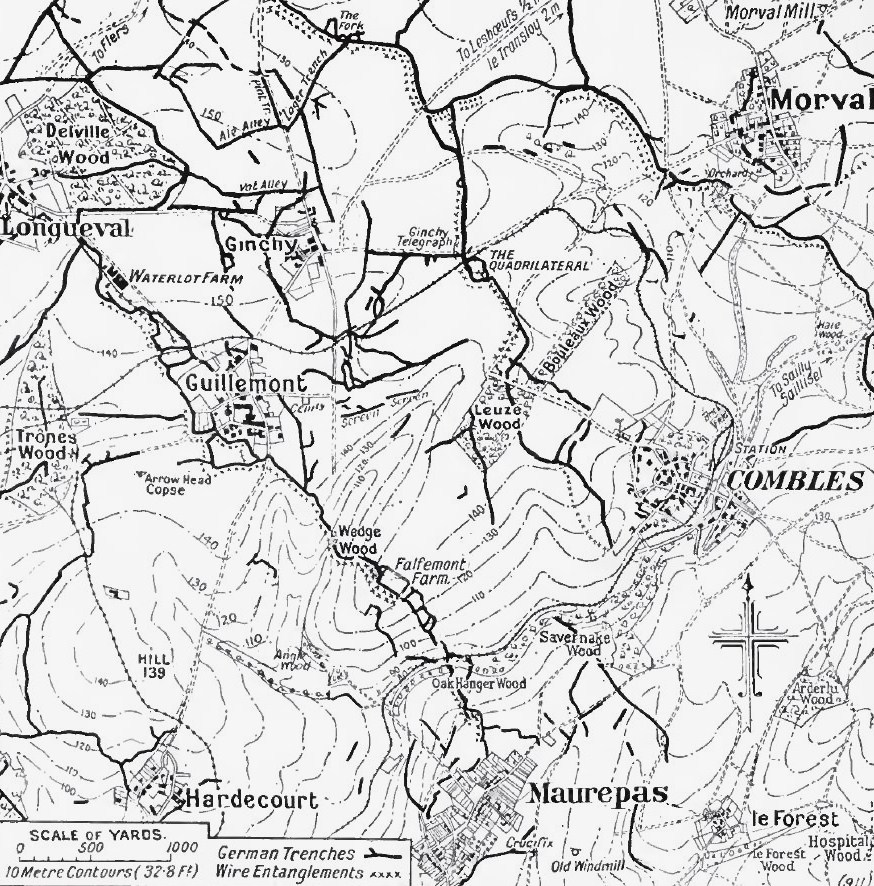
German defensive lines, vicinity of Delville Wood, Guillemont, Maurepas, Morval (July–September 1916)

The British attacks on 22/23 July, intended to prepare the way for a big attack, combined with the French north of the Somme, failed due to disorganisation, lack of co-ordination by the British and French armies and the effectiveness of the German defence. On 24 July, Haig instructed Rawlinson to concentrate on the right flank of the Fourth Army and co-ordinate attacks with the French but to keep up the pressure, rather than delay to arrange larger attacks. Subsidiary operations were to be conducted on the rest of the Fourth Army front to close up to the German second line, bringing the British line into a position favourable for another general attack. The French Sixth Army was reinforced by another corps on the north bank and captured documents were circulated, which revealed that the German defence had been instructed to occupy the front line with fewer troops and place units in echelon and depth for local counter-attacks, to exploit surprise and use engineers offensively.

Rawlinson issued instructions that with the French Sixth Army, XIII Corps was to capture the German second position from Falfemont Farm to Guillemont. A combined attack was planned for 30 July, by the French from Hem to Maurepas and the British from Falfemont Farm to Guillemont, with supporting attacks on the rest of the Fourth Army front. The British attack reached the village again and was driven out by flanking fire, one battalion losing 650 out of 770 men. Despite a GHQ directive of 16 July, a creeping barrage was not used because of shortages of ammunition and worn guns. Many German defensive positions were out of view of the British artillery and a deterioration in the weather grounded British artillery observation aircraft, reducing the accuracy of British bombardments. GHQ considered that the costly failure of the attacks on 30 July had been due to the tenacity of the German defence, the quality of its tactical leadership and the move towards defence in depth. Fresh German divisions were being thrown in as soon as they arrived, yet suffering many losses and more Allied attacks could cause the German defence to collapse. A pause by the Anglo-French to prepare larger combined attacks, would provide a respite for the defenders.

Foch and Haig met on 1 August to discuss the redeployment of most of the French Sixth Army to the north bank and the transfer of operations on the south bank to the Tenth Army (General Joseph Alfred Micheler) which received II Corps as a reinforcement. A common attack on 7 August and a combined attack on 11 August, were agreed but this quickly broke down, when the British part of the attack was postponed to 8 August. On 2 August, Haig directed that "careful and methodical" attacks were to be "pushed forward without delay" and that with the French, the line should be moved forward on the right flank around Guillemont, with "no serious attacks" on the left flank of the Fourth Army. Rawlinson continued to attack on the left flank of the Fourth Army and attacks with the French on the right flank were supported by artillery with far less ammunition than in July, were poorly co-ordinated and encountered unexpected delays, during several periods of wet weather. Another delay was caused by Lieutenant-General Walter Congreve the XIII Corps commander, being relieved due to illness on 10 August. He was replaced by the XIV Corps staff under Lieutenant-General Lord Cavan, which had to move from the Reserve Army front to take over.

Joffre met Haig on 11 August, to press his policy of combined broad-front attacks, proposing an attack on 22 August, to advance from the Somme northwards through Combles, Ginchy, High Wood and Thiepval, followed by an attack on 1 September, to take Bouchavesnes, Rancourt, Morval, Flers, Martinpuich, Courcelette and Grandcourt. Haig proposed a less ambitious attack, from the Somme to High Wood about 18 August to which Joffre agreed. Haig and Foch met on 19 August and arranged plans to capture Guillemont on 24 August, combined with French attacks from the Somme to Maurepas. Another attack was decided for 26 or 27 August, from Cléry to Le Forêt by the French and from Wedge Wood to Ginchy by the British. On 24 August, Haig criticised the Fourth Army headquarters for failing adequately to supervise the planning of attacks, which had been too narrow and conducted with insufficient forces. Haig wanted an attack on Guillemont with 2 1/2 divisions, to ensure a continuous attack on the whole front and far more scrutiny by Rawlinson of subordinates in the preparation of attacks. The need to replace divisions opposite Guillemont, difficulties in co-ordination with the French and several days of rain from 25 August, delayed the next attack until 3 September.

After taking over from XIII Corps in mid-August, Cavan held a meeting with the divisional commanders to discuss the next attack, at which it was stressed that it would take place along all of the Corps front and that supervision from above was not inconsistent with granting initiative to subordinates. The Corps General Officer Commanding Royal Artillery (GOCRA) was to decide the lines of barrages but liaise with divisions, which would work out the details. XIV Corps headquarters was to co-ordinate divisional plans, rather than dictate them, discretion by divisional commanders being retained within the corps plan, especially as command of the artillery reverted to divisions at zero hour. Observation posts were established with provision for telephone, visual and pigeon communication. Guillemont was captured and held, German counter-attacks defeated and the ground consolidated in a rainstorm overnight. Operations against Ginchy from the south and towards Leuze and Bouleaux woods commenced.

=== Anglo-French plans ===
In XIII Corps, the 35th Division was to attack at 5:00 a.m. on 20 July to take trenches between Maltz Horn Farm and Arrow Head Copse, preliminary to the general attack on Guillemont and on the rest of the German second position, after a thirty-minute bombardment to cover a French attack on the right, which was then cancelled. Two companies of the 105th Brigade, attacked against massed machine-gun and artillery-fire and were shelled out of the few parts of the German front line they reached; an attack at 11:35 a.m. by a battalion of the 104th Brigade also failed. The Fourth Army artillery began to register targets (firing ranging shots) on 21 July but poor visibility, made aircraft observation impossible at times. Co-ordination of the combined attack, proved impossible for the three armies and the 35th Division and 3rd Division attacked Guillemont early on 22 July and were repulsed. The bombardment for the series of attacks due on 22/23 July, began at 7:00 p.m. on 22 July, which alerted the Germans but the non-moon period was expected to protect the British infantry.

On 23 July, Haig ordered the Fourth Army to capture the German front line, as a preliminary to another general attack. XIII Corps was ordered to capture the German second position, from Falfemont Farm to Guillemont, during the next French attack on the north bank. Rawlinson and Foch met on 24 July and postponed the joint attack to 27 July, for more artillery preparation due to the poor visibility, as the French continued the "terrific" bombardment which had begun on 22 July. Meetings between Rawlinson, Fayolle, Foch and Haig continued to try to plan a combined attack, which was eventually arranged for 30 July but also had several zero hours. The 30th Division was to attack through the 35th Division positions, from Falfemont Farm to Guillemont and the 2nd Division to attack from Waterlot Farm at 4:45 a.m., as the only French attack took place from the river to Maurepas. The failure was similar to that of 23 July and was ascribed to the difficulty of attacking from the south-west and west, especially with no French attack over the head of the Maurepas ravine, north of the village. Most of the ground captured by the French was lost to German counter-attacks.

The British postponed their attack to 8 August, reduced the depth of the objective and made six "Chinese" attacks on 7 August, to inflict losses and mislead the defenders. (Note: The term came from a Chinese military practice of making noise and show to deceive an enemy, which had become the term for a simulated attack without an infantry advance; smoke-screens often being used.) The attack differed little from previous attempts, although careful briefings were conducted and elaborate measures taken to maintain communication, using the reports of aircrew on contact-patrol, where reconnaissance aircraft flew low over the battlefield to map the positions of British troops by observing ground flares, mirrors, lamps and panels. Brigade headquarters had been ignorant of events and arrangements were made for the swift transmission of information forwards. Visual signalling posts and relay posts for runners were prepared and messenger-pigeons taken forward. Infantry wore shiny tin discs on the back of their equipment, to be visible from the air and a wireless station was set up near Favière Wood. Visual signalling still failed again during the attack, due to mist, dust and smoke. Congestion in the British trenches in front of Trônes Wood made a fresh attack impossible until next day. On 9 August, some battalions had not arrived by zero hour, the attacks failed and British troops isolated in Guillemont were overwhelmed and captured.

Rawlinson discussed the situation with the commanders of the 55th, 2nd and 24th divisions and ordered that the next attack must be thoroughly prepared. Haig intervened to urge no delay on strategic grounds and discussed the problem posed by German defenders hiding in shell-holes and the débris of the village. Rawlinson met Fayolle later, to discuss the combined attack due on 11 August. On 10 August, XIII Corps reported that the attack would be ready by 17 August. The day was misty and rainy, which grounded aircraft and led to the attack being postponed for a day and ground taken by an advance of two companies of the 55th (West Lancashire) Division was abandoned, after the French attack was repulsed. Foch and Rawlinson met on 13 August, to plan an operation in which XIV Corps would attack Guillemont, after the French captured Maurepas and Angle Wood, followed by an attack by XIV Corps on Wedge Wood and Falfemont Farm, at dawn on 19 August. A combined attack on 22 August, from Le Forêt to Bois Douage by the French, prolonged from Leuze Wood to Ginchy by the British, was also arranged. Rawlinson and Fayolle agreed a preliminary attack for 16 August, from Angle Wood to south of Guillemont, which took place in hot weather, with special arrangements for counter-battery fire and communication. The British and French made a small advance but most of the captured ground was lost to a counter-attack overnight.

The plan for the combined attack on 18 August was drastically changed after the 16 August failure, with Rawlinson and Fayolle arranging to capture Guillemont in two days, as the French concentrated on taking Angle Wood and preparing for an attack on 22 August. A methodical bombardment for 36 hours was planned, with no increase in the rate of shelling before the attack and a field artillery "curtain" of fire was to precede the infantry, by dropping back from the German front line to no man's land 100 yd (91 m) in front of the British troops, then moving forward at 50 yd (46 m) per minute. The attack was to occur in two stages, with a two-hour pause for consolidation before the final advance. The day was dull and showery, the French attack was repulsed but British troops took parts of the first objective west of Falfemont Farm and west and north-west of Guillemont, as far as the station. On 20 August, Rawlinson met the corps commanders, discussed the policy of "relentless pressure" laid down by Haig and arranged an attack on the west side of Guillemont for 21 August.

A small attack on Arrow Head Copse failed, part of ZZ Trench into the village from the north was taken and the French captured Angle Wood. The attack on 21 August failed and the plan for 24 August was changed late on 22 August. The French would attack from the Somme to Maurepas, the 35th Division would conform but stop short of the German second position and the 20th Division would take the north edge of Guillemont and the south-west of Ginchy. A German artillery bombardment and counter-attack late on 23 August, led to the cancellation of the XIV Corps attack, except on the right of the 35th Division, the French attack mostly being repulsed. On 25 August, Rawlinson announced a series of divisional reliefs, which delayed the attack to the end of August, when it was arranged that XIV Corps would attack the German second position, from Falfemont Farm to Guillemont. Heavy rain began to fall on 25 August and turned the ground into a swamp, preventing the digging of assembly trenches, blocking routes to the front line and severely slowing the flow of supplies. The bombardment opened in the morning of 29 August and the attack was postponed again to 1 September, then postponed again to 3 September, because of a thunderstorm on 29 August.

A German bombardment on 26 August, was followed by the biggest counter-attack of the battle on 31 August at Delville Wood, north of the XIV Corps area opposite Guillemont. Preparation of the combined attack became easier, after the rain stopped on 30 August. The preliminary bombardment began at 8:00 a.m. on 2 September, from the boundary with the French Sixth Army to High Wood, with a German counter-bombardment mainly falling short on Ginchy. A periodic field artillery bombardment, swept the ground between the main German trenches and a creeping barrage was planned for the attack. The 5th Division next to the French, arranged for the infantry to keep about 25 yd (23 m) behind a barrage moving at 100 yd (91 m) per minute. The final objective of XIV Corps, was a line facing north-east, through the far end of Leuze Wood on the spur above Combles, gaining touch with the French at Savernake Wood, Falfemont Farm being taken as a preliminary at 9:00 a.m. on 3 September, when the French I Corps at Oakhanger Wood also advanced, the main attack by the Sixth and Fourth armies beginning at noon.

=== German preparations ===
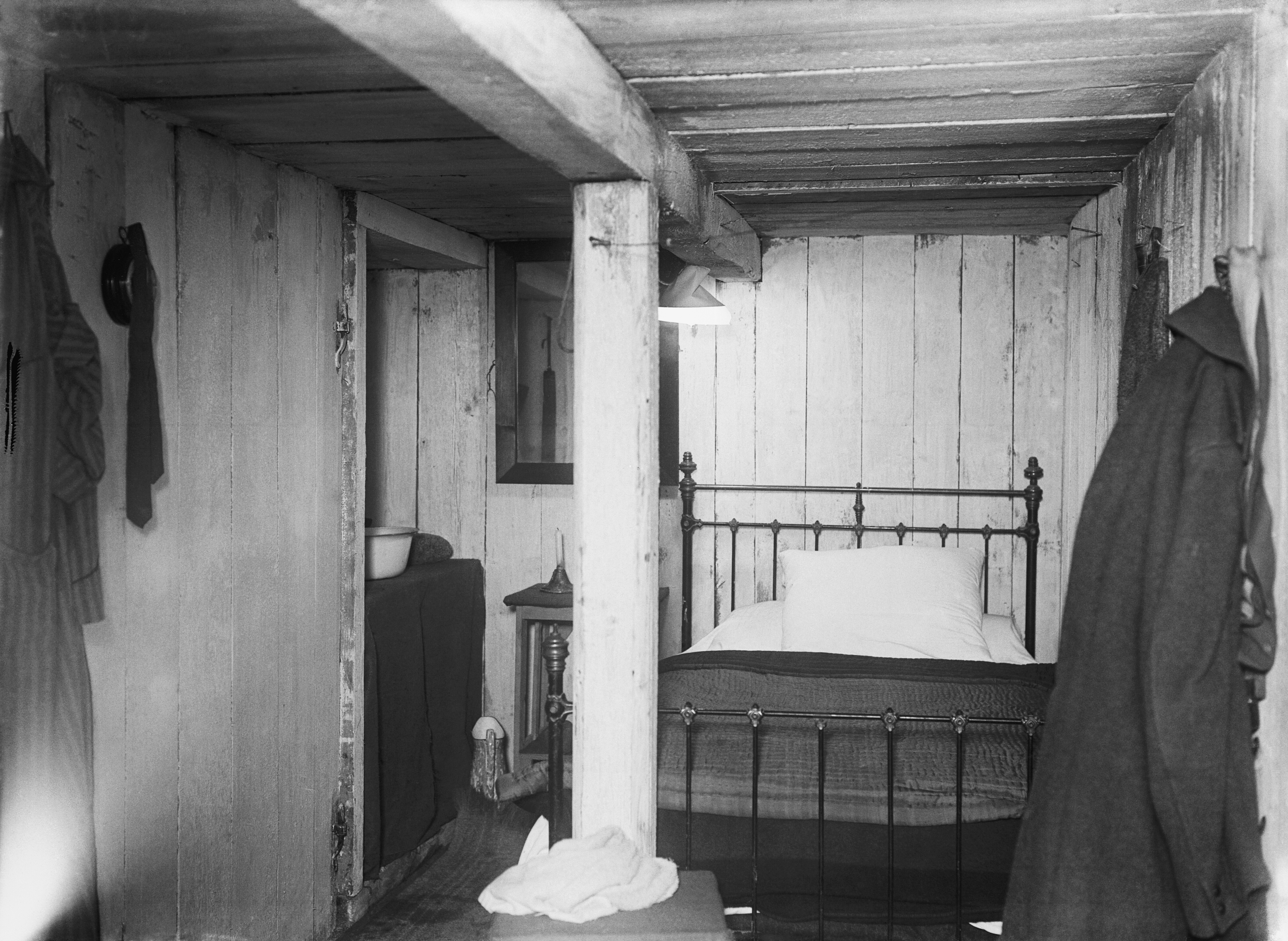
German bunker with bed, Somme 1916 IWM Q 1384.

Despite the obliteration of trench lines, by stupendous Allied artillery bombardments, the value of trenches as boundaries and rallying-points remained and as labour became available, new back lines and switch trenches were dug, sited according to the principles used by Loßberg in Champagne in late 1915. An artillery observation line was chosen and then a main line of resistance was dug 500–1,500 yd (460–1,370 m) in front, 200–400 yd (180–370 m) behind a crest overlooked by the observation line. Outposts were built along the crest, for infantry observers and listening-posts. Another line was built 2,000–3,000 yd (1.1–1.7 mi; 1.8–2.7 km) further back near the field artillery, which became known as the Artillerie Schutz Stellung (artillery protection line), ready to be occupied by reserves, if the forward area was overrun. Command and supply became more difficult in such dispersed defences, which led to a streamlining of the chain of command, with battalion commanders being given sole authority over an area, as the Kampf-Truppen-Kommandeur. Division commanders were given similar control of the forces in the divisional sector, except for aviation units and some heavy artillery being used for special tasks.

Gillemont and Ginchy lay on spurs, which constricted the British right flank and commanded the ground to the south, in the French Sixth Army area. During the time when the German third line and intermediate lines and redoubts, were being completed on the rear slopes of Bazentin Ridge, Allied attacks had become smaller and periods of wet weather, the terrain, supply and ammunition difficulties, combined with the German policy of unyielding defence and the reinforcements reaching the German 1st and 2nd armies, slowed the Anglo-French advance, particularly south of the Somme. The German second line ran north-west, from the French sector near Maurepas to Wedge Wood, behind Arrow Head Copse, in front of Guillemont, past the station and thence to Delville Wood and Longueval, before turning sharply west. The approaches to the village were bare and overlooked by German posts in Leuze Wood. A quarry west of the village and the ground to the south, from Maltzhorn Farm to Angle Wood and Falfemont Farm had been fortified.

The Germans were able to nullify much of the Anglo-French material superiority in the battle, particularly during the periods of cold and wet weather in late July and late August. The defence was as piecemeal as British attacks but with the French exposed to converging artillery-fire, on the Flaucourt Plateau south of the Somme and the British bogged down on Bazentin Ridge, the Germans used observation posts around Guillemont and High Wood, to observe fire into the salients around Maurepas and Guillemont from three sides. Poor weather was less of a handicap to the Germans, while they held such commanding ground. Positions were linked with more support and reserve trenches, behind the second position south and east of Delville Wood and new "switch trenches" dug oblique to forward lines, were used to prevent Anglo-French infantry from "rolling up" German defences, from an isolated penetration.

German field fortifications continued to be defended by machine-gun fire, artillery-fire and swift local counter-attacks, extra heavy artillery brought from Verdun, was used to extend bombardments beyond the Allied front line, to artillery positions and supply routes. New German defensive works were harder to spot, during the fewer periods of good flying weather, often not being revealed until attacking infantry were engaged from them. The Germans also gained an advantage, from being forced back, as the area most devastated by artillery-fire grew wider and was on the Allied side, which created chronic problems in transporting supplies to the front line, periodically made worse by downpours, which turned roads and tracks into glissades of mud. It was far easier for supplies to be brought up to the German front line, as it was pushed back along supply lines that had been established for two years.

== Battle ==
=== French Sixth Army ===
==== July–September ====
Weather 1 August – 6 September 1916
Date	Rain mm	High & low temperatures	
1	0.0	82–59 °F (28–15 °C)	hot hazy
2	0.0	88–57 °F (31–14 °C)	hot
3	0.0	84–57 °F (29–14 °C)	hot
4	0.0	79–52 °F (26–11 °C)	—
5	0.0	68–48 °F (20–9 °C)	fine
6	0.0	75–52 °F (24–11 °C)	—
7	0.0	73–50 °F (23–10 °C)	—
8	0.0	77–52 °F (25–11 °C)	—
9	0.0	84–54 °F (29–12 °C)	—
10	4.0	70–55 °F (21–13 °C)	dull
11	0.0	77–59 °F (25–15 °C)	mist rain
12	1.0	82–63 °F (28–17 °C)	—
13	0.0	81–59 °F (27–15 °C)	wind
14	2.0	77–59 °F (25–15 °C)	rain
15	0.0	75–55 °F (24–13 °C)	rain
16	2.0	75–55 °F (24–13 °C)	—
17	4.0	72–54 °F (22–12 °C)	rain
18	1.0	70–55 °F (21–13 °C)	dull
19	2.0	70–50 °F (21–10 °C)	dull
20	0.0	72–54 °F (22–12 °C)	dull
21	0.0	72–48 °F (22–9 °C)	—
22	0.0	72–52 °F (22–11 °C)	—
23	0.0	72–54 °F (22–12 °C)	—
24	0.0	78–55 °F (26–13 °C)	—
25	8.0	81–61 °F (27–16 °C)	dull
26	7.0	75–59 °F (24–15 °C)	—
27	4.0	73–59 °F (23–15 °C)	—
28	0.1	73–59 °F (23–15 °C)	flood
29	?	82–59 °F (28–15 °C)	flood
30	8.0	63–48 °F (17–9 °C)	mud
31	0.0	70–52 °F (21–11 °C)	fine
1	0.0	72–52 °F (22–11 °C)	—
2	0.0	75–52 °F (24–11 °C)	wind
3	4	72–50 °F (22–10 °C)	—
4	25	66–52 °F (19–11 °C)	rain
5	0.0	63–54 °F (17–12 °C)	dull
6	0.0	70–52 °F (21–11 °C)	dull

A German counter-attack on 15 July, by Stoßtrupp companies and a flame thrower detachment, retook the east end of Biaches before being driven out. (Military units in this section are French unless specified.) Over the next few days German counter-attacks took parts of Biaches, Bois Blaise and La Maisonette, beginning a period of costly stalemate in the area. The French attacked between Vermandovillers and Barleux and the 16th Colonial Division captured the German front position, before cross-fire from machine-guns stopped the advance and counter-attacks pushed the French back to the start line, the Colonial Corps losing 8,000 casualties from 15 to 21 July. XXXV Corps was reinforced by two extra divisions and heavy artillery from the north bank and attacked from Vermandovillers to Soyécourt, capturing Bois Étoile and the northern half of Soyécourt, before flanking fire from high ground prevented another advance.

North of the Somme, the 39th Division and 11th Division had been relieved by the fresh 47th Division, 153rd Division and XX Corps attacked the German intermediate line. On the Hem plateau near the river, the 47th (1/2nd London) Division captured Bois Sommet, Bois de l'Observatoire and the west end of Bois de la Pépinière, an advance of 2,600–3,900 ft (800–1,200 m) in which 600 prisoners were taken. The German defenders of Monacu Farm held out and the left flank of the division was stopped short of the intermediate line. To the north, the 153rd Division was held up on its right and took the objective on the left around Maurepas, despite the failure of a supporting attack by the 35th Division on Maltz Horn Farm.

French attacks north of the Somme were resumed on 30 August by the 11th Division and the 39th Division, after delays caused by bad weather. The Germans had dispersed into new smaller positions in greater depth, many of which were concealed by crops several feet high. The attack was "devastated" by German artillery and machine-gun fire, contact with the front was lost when telephone lines were cut and fog made visual signalling impossible; most of the French infantry were forced back to their start line, with 3,600 losses. Operations south of the Somme were transferred to the Tenth Army and artillery reinforcements arrived on both sides of the Somme. The Sixth Army captured the Hem plateau on the north bank from 1 to 11 August by stages, before a bigger attack on 12 August captured the German second line from the Somme to Maurepas. Attacks on German positions on the army boundary to the north and around Guillemont failed. The French mopped up the remaining German defences in the second position, which brought the Sixth Army to a position from which it could attack a German intermediate line between Le Forêt and Cléry, in front of the third position, beyond which there were no more German defences.

The Sixth Army was reinforced near the river on 3 September, by XXXIII Corps with the 70th Division and 77th Division astride the river and VII Corps with the 45th Division, 46th Division, 47th Division and 66th Division. XX Corps on the French left was relieved by I Corps (Lieutenant-General Adolphe Guillaumat), with the 1st Division, 2nd Division; several fresh or rested brigades were distributed to each corps. Control of the creeping barrage was delegated to commanders closer to the battle and a communications system using flares, Roman candles, flags and panels, telephones, optical signals, pigeons and message runners was set up to maintain contact with the front line. Four French divisions attacked north of the Somme at noon on 3 September. Cléry was subjected to a machine-gun barrage from the south bank and VII Corps captured most of the village, much of the German position along the Cléry–Le Forêt road and all of the village of Le Forêt. On the left, I Corps advanced 0.62 mi (1 km), occupied high ground south of Combles and entered Bois Douage in one hour.

On 4 September, the Germans counter-attacked at the Combles ravine, stopping the French advance towards Rancourt and the French captured Sivas Trench and consolidated Cléry, before pushing forward to within attacking distance of the German third line. The British took Falfemont Farm on 5 September and gained touch with the French at Combles ravine. Patrols captured Ferme de l'Hôpital 0.5 mi (0.80 km) east of Le Forêt and reached a ridge behind the track from Cléry to Ferme de l'Hôpital, which forced the Germans to retire to the third line in some confusion, XX Corps having taken 2,000 prisoners. VII Corps took all of Cléry and met XXXIII Corps on the right, which had taken Ommiécourt south of the Somme along with 4,200 prisoners, as the most advanced French troops reached the German gun-line.

An attack by I Corps failed on 6 September and attacks were delayed for six days, as the difficulty in supplying such a large force on the north bank was made worse by rain. The Sixth Army front had increased in length, diverged from the line of the Fourth Army advance and a defensive flank being made along Combles ravine by I Corps. V Corps in army reserve was moved forward and Foch issued warning orders for the Cavalry Corps to prepare to exploit a German collapse. Transport difficulties became so bad that Guillaumat ordered all stranded vehicles to be thrown off the roads and to move in daylight, despite German artillery-fire, ready for the resumption of attacks on 12 September.

=== French Tenth Army ===
The Tenth Army had fourteen infantry and three cavalry divisions in the II Corps, X Corps and XXXV Corps (Military units in this section are French unless specified.) but many of the divisions had been transferred from Verdun and were understrength. The army attacked on the right flank of the Sixth Army, south of the Somme on 4 September, adding to the pressure on the German defence, which had been depleted by the fighting north of the Somme since July. The original German front position ran from Chilly, northwards to Soyécourt then along the new German first line north to Barleux, which had been established after the Sixth Army advances in July. The German defences were manned by five divisions and ran northwards through the fortified villages of Chilly, Vermandovillers, Soyécourt, Deniécourt, Berny-en-Santerre and Barleux. A second line of defence ran from Chaulnes (behind woods to the west and north and the château park, from which the Germans had observation over the ground south of the Flaucourt plateau), Pressoir, Ablaincourt, Mazancourt and Villers-Carbonnel. The attack took place from Chilly on the right flank to Barleux on the left, to gain ground on the Santerre plateau, ready to exploit a possible German collapse and capture crossings over the Somme south of Péronne. A four-stage advance behind a creeping barrage was planned, although reinforcements of artillery and ammunition were not available, due to the demand for resources at Verdun and north of the Somme.

Much of the destructive and counter-battery bombardment in the X and XXXV corps sectors had little effect, against defences which the Germans had improved and reinforced with more infantry. After six days of bombardment, the attack by ten divisions began on a 17 mi (27 km) front. The five German divisions opposite were alert and well dug-in but X Corps captured Chilly and part of the woods in the centre of the corps front. The corps was checked on the left at Bois Blockhaus copse, behind the German front line. In XXXV Corps in the centre, the 132nd Division briefly held Vermandovillers and the 43rd Division advanced from Bois Étoile and took Soyécourt. II Corps failed on its right flank, where parts of the German front line held out but advanced further in the north. At Barleux, the 77th Division was obstructed by uncut wire and the advanced troops were cut off and destroyed. German troops in front line dugouts that had not been mopped-up, emerged behind them and stopped the supporting waves in no man's land. More ground was taken, preparatory to an attack on the second objective but the offensive was suspended on 7 September, after large German counter-attacks. The French took 4,000 prisoners and Foch doubled the daily allotment of ammunition, to capture the German second position. From 15 to 18 September, the Tenth Army attacked again and captured Berny, Vermandovillers and Déniecourt and several thousand more prisoners.

=== Fourth Army ===
==== July ====
XIII Corps attacked Guillemont with the 30th Division at 3:40 a.m. on 23 July. The 21st Brigade attacked with one battalion from Trônes Wood and one from Longueval Alley to the north. The bombardment of the village and the trenches in front of it appeared to have been highly destructive, as was a standing barrage by heavy artillery, on a line from Falfemont Farm to Wedge Wood, Leuze Wood, east of Guillemont to the south of Ginchy. The field artillery fired a creeping barrage in four lifts through the village, stopping on the south and east sides, 45 minutes after zero hour. The attack from Trônes Wood reached the German wire with few casualties, where they found uncut wire and were engaged by artillery and machine-gun fire. The wire was forced, despite many casualties and Guillemont entered. The German garrison continued to fight despite many losses and the most advanced British troops were cut off, as German reinforcements arrived and overwhelmed most of the battalion. Communication with the rear had been cut by a German barrage in no-man's-land and a smoke screen, intended to mask the attack from the Germans in Ginchy.

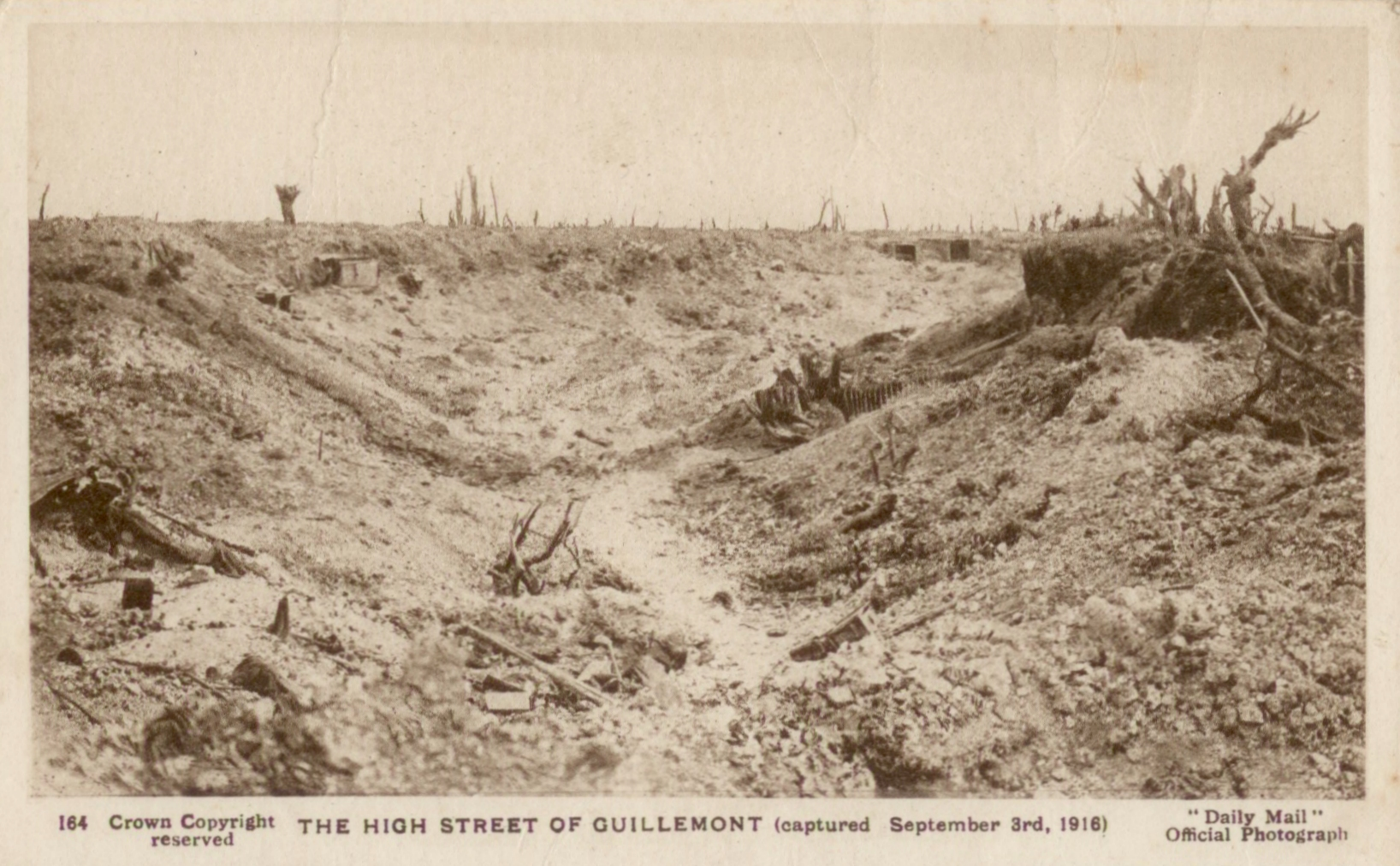
High Street, Guillemont in 1916.

The left-hand battalion got lost in the gloom and smoke blown over Guillemont, some troops veered right and met uncut wire south-east of the village, before falling back to Trônes Wood. Another party took a trench south of the railway, which ran eastwards past the north end of Guillemont and was then pushed back to trenches near Waterlot Farm, obstructing the right of the 3rd Division. On the left, the 3rd Division attacked Guillemont Station, Delville Wood and Longueval, with the 8th Brigade on the right attempting to occupy ground south of the railway. The troops of the 8th Brigade were held up, then fell back to Waterlot Farm, repulsing a German counter-attack later in the morning. Further north, a battalion also tried to bomb down trenches from Waterlot Farm, either side of the Guillemont road and the railway, to the station. The advance was soon stopped by machine-gun fire from Ginchy and the ground to the north-east, forcing the troops to withdraw; the 9th Brigade attacked Delville Wood and Longueval as part of the Battle of Delville Wood.

On 30 July, the 30th Division attacked again, through the positions of the 35th Division again at 4:45 a.m. as the French Sixth Army attacked on the right. The 89th Brigade attacked Falfemont Farm and the second position, up to the edge of Guillemont, which was attacked by the 90th Brigade. Guillemont station and trenches to the north-west were attacked by the 5th Brigade of the 2nd Division. As the troops moved up during the night of 29 July, a German bombardment fell around Trônes Wood and caught troops from the 89th and 90th brigades. At dawn, fog rose and visibility fell below 40 yd (37 m); Maltz Horn Farm and trenches nearby, were stormed at zero hour, by a British battalion from the west and part of the French 153rd Division from the south. The British advanced to the Hardecourt–Guillemont road, despite many losses and dug in with reinforcements, which had moved forwards in small columns. No French troops could be seen and few of the left-hand battalion reached the road, although a larger party reached an orchard at the south-east edge of Guillemont. On the left, the 90th Brigade advanced either side of the Trônes Wood–Guillemont track, got into the village with few losses and took 50 prisoners. After a pause, the creeping barrage moved on and the north-east of the village was occupied, touch being gained with the left-hand battalion and a counter-attack repulsed. The left-hand battalion had advanced south of the railway and taken many prisoners at the German front trench, before being stopped by crossfire from the quarry to the south and the station to the north. Another attempt to advance and an effort to form a defensive flank along the railway facing north failed, due to uncut wire and machine-gun fire from the flank, which forced a withdrawal.

Communication with the rear broke down again, as German artillery-fire cut telephone wires and visual signalling was obstructed by the fog, until about 9:00 a.m. Pigeons and runners carried a few messages and at 8:55 a.m., the divisional commander, Major-General John Shea, ordered a line from Maltz Horn Farm to the west side of Guillemont to be consolidated and held at all costs. In the afternoon, the party at the orchard withdrew with difficulty and troops on the Hardecourt–Guillemont road fell back later. On the right flank, the British held on around Maltz Horn Farm, as German infantry advanced through British heavy artillery-fire on Leuze Wood, the crossroads east of Guillemont and Ginchy. Artillery-fire on Guillemont was impossible, because of the British party still holding out; all the British reserves had been committed, which left none to reinforce the troops in the village, who were overwhelmed around 2:00 p.m. On the left flank, the 2nd Division attacked with the 5th Brigade, from Waterlot Farm to Guillemont railway station, with protective machine-gun fire from Delville Wood on the left. Many German machine-gun posts were undamaged and few British troops crossed the German front line to reach the vicinity of the station, where they were shot down, the survivors of the two battalions eventually being withdrawn through a German bombardment. In the heat of the afternoon, the two brigades of the 30th Division reorganised and the 89th Brigade consolidated the only captured ground still held, from the French boundary near Maltz Horn Farm to the Hardecourt–Guillemont road and Arrow Head Copse. During the night the 30th Division and 35th Division were relieved by the 55th (West Lancashire) Division.

==== August ====
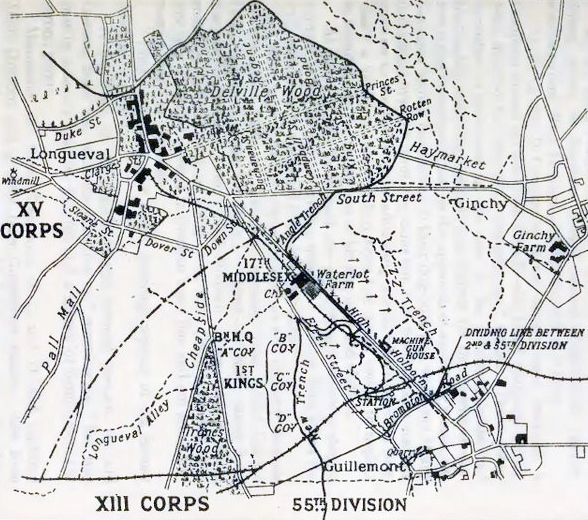
2nd Division, Guillemont, 8 August 1916

The 55th (West Lancashire) Division (Major-General Hugh Jeudwine) attacked at 4:20 a.m. on 8 August into an easterly wind, which, with mist, dust and smoke from a German counter-barrage, made visual signalling impossible, delaying reports to the 55th (West Lancashire) Division headquarters until after 6:00 a.m. Next to the French, a reinforced battalion of the 165th Brigade advanced over the spur south of Guillemont and was then stopped by German defensive fire and driven under cover in shell-holes. Bombers had moved south-east along Cochrane Alley, into Maurepas ravine, established a trench-block and found themselves unsupported on both flanks, as the French advance had also been stopped by the Germans south-east of Maltz Horn Farm. The right-hand battalion of the 164th Brigade was held up by uncut wire at the south-western edge of Guillemont, where the infantry tried to dig in beyond grenade range, before retiring to their jumping-off trenches. The left-hand battalion broke through on either side of the quarry at the west side of Guillemont and entered the village; reinforcements sent to hold the captured front line behind them were bombed out by a German counter-attack from the south. German machine-guns began to sweep no-man's-land and isolated the British troops in the village.

Further north, the 2nd Division attacked with two battalions of the 6th Brigade on the north side of the railway line, where the right-hand battalion reached Guillemont station, except for the fourth company, which was blocked by German troops who reoccupied their front line behind the advanced British troops. The left-hand battalion attacked from Waterlot Farm and reached ZZ Trench, then made a costly attempt to bomb south, losing most of a company before reaching the north end of Guillemont. Communication broke down again during the morning; smoke and dust blocked the view of aircraft observers and no messages were received from Guillemont. The trenches east of Trônes Wood were congested with troops and bombarded by German artillery in the afternoon, which made it impossible for the British to attack again. Jeudwine ordered the 164th Brigade to send more troops into the village after dark and Congreve and the Fourth Army headquarters ordered another attack at 4:20 a.m. on 9 August.

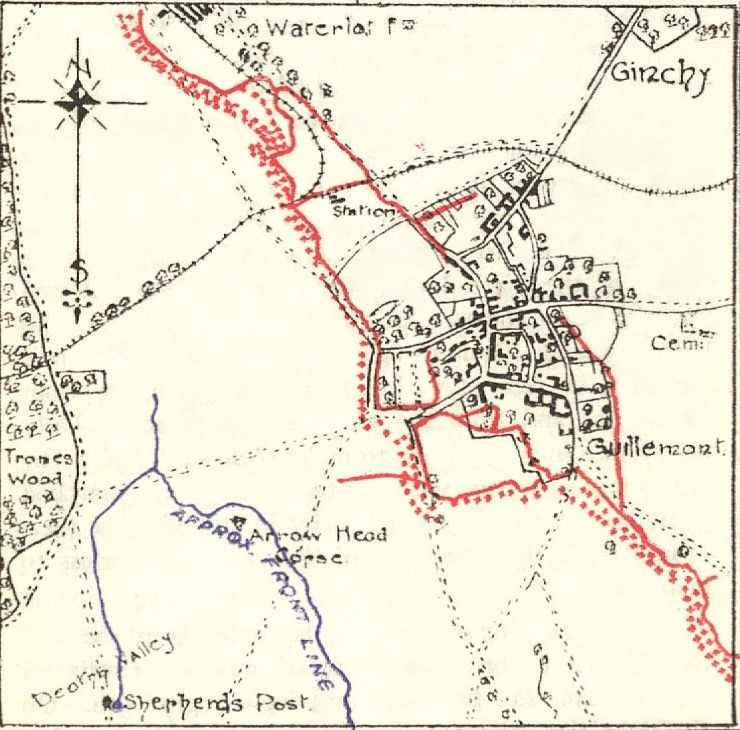
55th (West Lancashire) Division positions at Guillemont

By zero hour, some of the attacking battalions were in position but were met by massed machine-gun fire when they advanced after a hurried bombardment. Disorganisation hampered the attack on the left, where the 166th Brigade was replacing the 164th Brigade. One battalion hugged the barrage and reached the German wire, where it had many casualties attempting to press on. The left-hand battalion was delayed, only beginning its advance after the British barrage had lifted but German small-arms fire quickly stopped the advance. Later in the day, an attack by the 165th Brigade from the positions captured on 8 August also failed. To the north, the 2nd Division attacked again with a battalion of the 6th Brigade south of the railway line, which was repulsed and an attack from Waterlot Farm also failed. The parties from the 55th (West Lancashire) Division, which had got into Guillemont either side of the quarry on 8 August and that of the 2nd Division, which had bombed its way along ZZ Trench into the north end of the village, amid much smoke and confusion, were quickly counter-attacked by German local reserves, until two more German battalions arrived and overwhelmed them. Isolated groups held out for a while at the quarry and more held out at the station until overrun late on 9 August, being seen from the British lines moving towards Ginchy under German escort.

Rawlinson met Congreve and the 55th, 2nd and 24th division commanders on 9 August and suspended the attack until much more thorough preparations had been made; the 2nd Division was relieved by the 24th Division during the night of 9/10 August. A combined attack was planned with the Sixth Army for 11 August, when the French would attack either side of Maurepas with a flank guard on the left from the 165th Brigade. The British would capture the spur south of Guillemont by advancing 300 yd (270 m) north, from the junction of Cochrane Alley and the Hardecourt–Guillemont road, covered by French attacks into the Maurepas ravine. Joint attacks on Maurepas and Guillemont were expected to be ready by 17 August. On 10 August, mist and rain grounded artillery-observation aircraft, forcing a postponement of the attack but 12 August was fine and clear. The French attack captured much of the German second position from Cléry to Maurepas and the southern portion of the village. The British attack began at 5:15 p.m., after a preliminary bombardment and was covered by a bombardment on the German positions in the south of Guillemont and the second position. Bombers advanced down Cochrane Alley on the right and in the open on the left, reaching the objective in 30 minutes, despite machine-gun and rifle fire. French troops on the right did not appear and the troops were withdrawn after dark, except for the trench block in Cochrane Alley. German counter-attacks overnight in the Sixth Army area prevented a resumption of French attacks on 13 August.

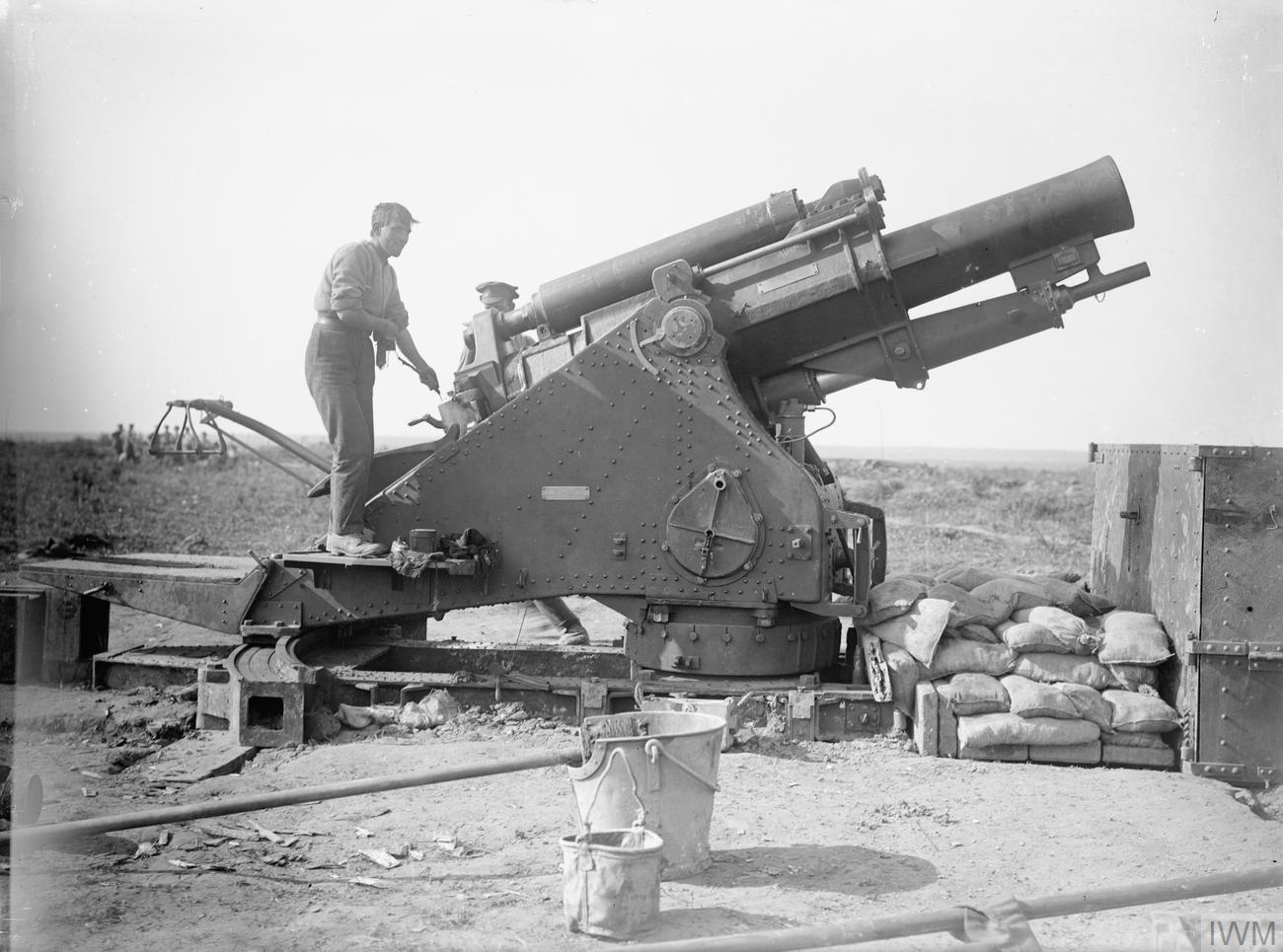
A 9.2 inch howitzer in the Carnoy Valley, September 1916 IWM Q 1294.

On 16 August, the French 153rd Division advanced north-west of Maurepas and into Maurepas ravine, before being repulsed by a counter-attack at 10:30 p.m. The 3rd Division had relieved the 55th (West Lancashire) Division on the night of 14/15 August, ready to attack at 5:40 p.m. on 16 August, which dawned bright and hot. (Note: From 30 July to 16 August, the 55th (West Lancashire) Division advanced the line 500 yd (460 m) on the right and 300 yd (270 m) on the left, dug 30,000 yd (17 mi; 27 km) of trench and improved 3,000 yd (1.7 mi; 2.7 km) of existing trenches.) On the right of the 76th Brigade, a battalion quickly cleared Cochrane Alley to the Hardecourt–Guillemont road and took the trench along the road, despite machine-gun fire from Lonely Trench, which was too close to the British front line to be bombarded by artillery. A Stokes mortar bombardment on Lonely Trench failed and attacks by the left-hand battalion of the 76th Brigade and right-hand battalion of the 9th Brigade were defeated, despite several attempts. The left-hand battalion of the 9th Brigade was also stopped soon after beginning its advance. After dark, the British withdrew on the right, only the ground in Cochrane Alley being retained. To the north, a 24th Division attack with a battalion of the 72nd Brigade on German strong-points south of the Trônes Wood–Guillemont track also failed.

Late on 17 August, the British withdrew during a bombardment by heavy howitzers on Lonely Trench, until 8:00 a.m. next day. After two hours, two battalions tried to capture the trench by surprise but were repulsed and another attempt by a composite battalion at 4:00 a.m. on 18 August also failed. The 3rd Division attacked on the right with the 76th Brigade, which reached the first objective near the Hardecourt–Guillemont road on the right and Lonely Trench on the left, some troops also reaching the road beyond. A battalion of the 9th Brigade on the left advanced a short distance before being stopped, which exposed the troops further south to flanking fire from the north and forced them to withdraw. The troops on the right flank were engaged by German machine-gunners firing up the slope from the right and began to dig in. French troops had taken more of Maurepas and advanced either side of the village, gaining touch with the British on their left. Attempts to capture the north end of Lonely Trench and a bombing attack from the north failed and the left battalion of the 9th Brigade was caught in cross-fire when it attacked the German trenches south-east of Arrow Head Copse, only a few parties briefly reaching the objective; the second stage of the attack was suspended.

On the right of the 24th Division, the 73rd Brigade attacked either side of the Trônes Wood–Guillemont track. The battalion to the south of the 73ed Brigade kept close to the barrage but its advance was stopped by machine-gun fire at the German front line. Attempts to get into the trench failed and a German counter-bombardment made the passage of reinforcements impossible. The battalion attacking north of the track was also held up on the right but on the left managed to get into the German front line near the quarry, despite German counter-attacks, as British reinforcements arrived to help consolidate. To the north, touch was gained with the right-hand battalion of the 17th Brigade, which had been unable to see where the barrage began to creep but had advanced anyway and taken many German prisoners. The brigade reached the German front line and part of Waterlot Farm road at the second objective, which were quickly consolidated. Communication by telephone and visual signals did not collapse, which kept the supporting artillery in contact with the infantry.

The left-hand battalion reached the north end of ZZ Trench quickly enough to surprise the garrison. Bombers worked down the German trench along Waterlot Farm road, met the right-hand battalion and then bombed their way north-eastwards to the rest of ZZ Trench, taking about 100 prisoners, then joined with troops of the 14th Division at the XV Corps boundary. German artillery-fire on the Anglo-French boundary was maintained all day; in the evening the Germans counter-attacked and pushed back the French to the south-western slopes of Maurepas ravine. Some troops on the right of the 76th Brigade also fell back; exaggerated reports of a repulse led to a special reconnaissance early on 19 August, which found that the Germans opposite the 76th Brigade had withdrawn to a line from Falfemont Farm to Wedge Wood and air reconnaissance confirmed that Lonely Trench was empty. During the day, troops from the 76th Brigade and the 8th Brigade on the left were able to dig in beyond the Hardecourt–Guillemont road, reoccupy Lonely Trench and gain touch with the French, who also reoccupied ground to the right. During the night of 19/20 August, the 3rd Division was relieved by the 35th Division.

On the night of 20/21 August, French troops captured Angle Wood and gained touch with the British along the slope of Maurepas ravine. The 35th Division had taken over the right of the 24th Division to the Trônes Wood–Guillemont track. At 5:00 a.m. on 21 August, the 35th Division failed to capture a German strong point opposite Arrow Head Copse. The 24th Division on the left was subjected to much German artillery-fire but parties from two battalions occupied unopposed the remainder of ZZ Trench leading into Guillemont. At 4:30 p.m., the 35th Division discharged a smoke screen to cover the right of the 24th Division, which attacked the quarry with a battalion of the 72nd Brigade, as two companies of the 17th Brigade attacked south-eastwards from near Guillemont railway station. The attack on the quarry failed after a long bombing fight and the attack from the station was costly to both sides, the British being too depleted to hold the captured ground. The 20th Division relieved the 24th Division by dawn on 22 August and on the night of 22/23 August, the 35th Division took over Angle Wood from the French.

Preparations for the next attack were interrupted by a German counter-attack on 23 August. German artillery bombarded the lines of the 20th Division at 9:15 p.m. and attacked the area south of the railway. The German advance was stopped by machine-gun fire but caused much confusion in the British positions, which were full of engineer and pioneer working parties. At 12:30 a.m., more German artillery-fire stopped work for the night and the 20th Division attack was cancelled in the morning. The infantry of the 35th Division had also been extensively bombarded and Rawlinson cancelled all of the XIV Corps attack, except on the right flank of the 35th Division, which was to guard the French flank. At 5:45 p.m. on 24 August, the French attacked from the Somme to the British boundary. The left division of the French I Corps took the German second position south-east of Falfemont Farm and formed a defensive flank on the left, connected with the 35th Division below the Falfemont Farm spur. The rest of Maurepas was captured and I Corps pushed a salient east of the village, halfway to Le Forêt. On the night of 26/27 August, the 5th Division relieved the 35th Division.

==== September, Capture of Guillemont ====
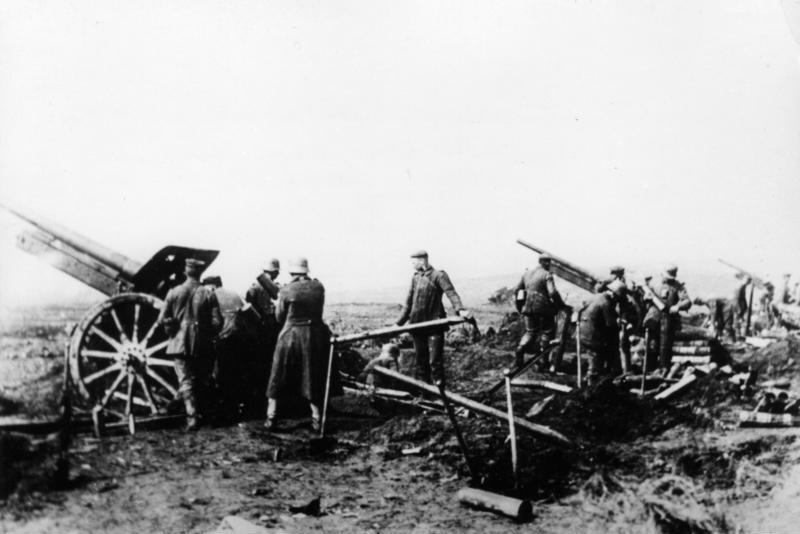
German 10 cm Kanone 14

The 5th Division, on the right flank of XIV Corps, assembled a battalion of the 13th Brigade in captured trenches on the Leuze Wood Spur, about 400 yd (370 m) short of Falfemont Farm on 3 September. The battalion attacked at 8:50 a.m., between Point 48 and the farm grounds on the left, as German defensive fire pinned down the French 127th Regiment in the ravine; the French barrage in support of the British, was abruptly switched south against a German counter-attack. The British troops were fired on from the front and flanks, which inflicted c. 300 casualties. A resumption of the attack was ordered, as German artillery fired on the British assembly trenches. At noon, the 95th Brigade attacked the spur north of Falfemont Farm towards Guillemont; both battalions took the German first line and then captured dug-outs and a machine-gun nest near Wedge Wood. The attack began again at 12:50 p.m. and captured the German second line, from Wedge Wood to the south-eastern fringe of the village, against slight resistance. The right-hand battalion had many casualties when fired on from Falfemont Farm, as the 13th Brigade attacked it again and advanced towards Wedge Wood. Flanking machine-gun fire was encountered from Combles ravine, as another French attack took place further south, towards Bois Douage, north-east of Maurepas. A small advance was made on the left, south of Wedge Wood but "feeble" British artillery support was inaccurate and the creeping barrage fell behind one of the attacking battalions.

The 95th Brigade easily advanced to the third objective on the Wedge Wood–Ginchy road at 2:50 p.m. Consolidation began, touch was gained with troops of the 20th Division in Guillemont and 150 prisoners were taken. The battalions in support had moved forward promptly and communication with the advance had been maintained by flares at each objective, which were reported by ground and air observers. The repulse of the 13th Brigade required its relief by the 15th Brigade, which delayed the attack on Falfemont Farm until 6:30 p.m. The attack on the right was stopped again by flanking machine-gun fire but Wedge Wood was captured on the left and touch gained with the 95th Brigade on the Ginchy road. A further advance by the 95th Brigade to the final objective was not made despite the ground in front appearing to be empty of Germans, as the failure at Falfemont Farm and the position of the 20th Division to the north, would have created a salient. At 7:35 p.m., attacks were suspended by Major-General Reginald Stephens, the 5th Division commander, until the next day. The 5th Division battalions had about 700 men each before the attack and casualties during the day were 40 per cent, mostly wounded.

On the 20th Division front, the line had been pushed close to the west and south-west of Guillemont; assembly trenches dug near the station made an attack from the north-west feasible. The 59th Brigade, due to attack the south end of the village, was so depleted that a battalion was attached from each of the 60th and 61st brigades and the 47th Brigade of the 16th (Irish) Division, relieved the 60th Brigade for the attack on the northern part of the village. On the left flank of the 59th Brigade, a battalion advanced through the British barrage before zero hour and surprised the defenders, as a battalion from the 47th Brigade did the same north of Mount Street. The main attack began at noon and in twenty minutes, the 59th Brigade reached the first objective along the Hardecourt road to Mount Street, the left-hand battalion mopping-up at the quarry to the north where the battalion of the 47th Brigade had pressed on. The left-hand battalion of the 47th Brigade attacked from the station and overran the German defences, as contact patrols reported the capture of the first objective by 12:30 p.m. The advance to the second objective began at 12:50 p.m., against much more artillery and machine-gun fire. Two battalions reinforced the 59th Brigade and one battalion leap-frogged through the right-hand battalion of the 47th Brigade.

By 1:15 p.m., the battalions consolidated near North and South streets, before advancing again at 2:50 p.m., to the Wedge Wood–Ginchy road against little opposition as the 47th Brigade prolonged the line to the north. The infantry reorganised swiftly and before 3:30 p.m., a fresh battalion and a pioneer company occupied Guillemont and dug-in, touch being gained with 5th Division troops later. A report arrived at 5:15 p.m. that the 7th Division had been forced out of Ginchy, which led to the advance to Leuze Wood being cancelled, apart from patrols. German counter-attacks across the Guillemont–Ginchy road at 5:30 and 6:30 p.m. were repulsed. Rain began to fall after dark, as the new line was consolidated, with the 59th Brigade along the Wedge Wood–Ginchy road and the 47th Brigade on a line from Guillemont, to the south-west corner of Ginchy. At dusk, German aircraft appeared and an accurate bombardment began on the new positions. Supporting attacks by the Fourth Army further north failed and more were ordered by Rawlinson for 3:10 p.m., after a preliminary bombardment from dawn.

Dawn on 4 September was accompanied by wind and showers, as the 5th Division prepared to attack the German second position from Point 48 to Wedge Wood and Valley Trench to the north. Two battalions from the 16th (Irish) Division were attached to the 5th Division and one to the 20th Division. The 15th Brigade prepared to attack Falfemont Farm again, having gained touch with French troops overnight, who did not attack as arranged at 3:05 p.m., which led to the British being raked by machine-gun fire from Combles ravine. A party reached the farm and was bombed out, as a battalion began to bomb south-eastwards from Wedge Wood and another battalion worked round covered by the spur, part of the farm being captured by 4:00 p.m. A frontal attack at 5:30 p.m. failed and a battalion was detailed to sap forward overnight. Patrols near the Leuze Wood spur prevented German reinforcements from moving forward and troops seen advancing from Combles were dispersed by British artillery-fire. In the 95th Brigade area, Valley Trench was occupied with one casualty and the edge of Leuze Wood was reached at 7:30 p.m., where the British barrage stopped the advance temporarily, before the wood was entered and consolidated, few German troops being seen.

The situation in Ginchy was obscure but British troops were believed to be in occupation, German troops still holding out between the village and the Quadrilateral. (Note: The Quadrilateral was a rectangular trench 300 yd × 150 yd (270 m × 140 m) on a sunken part of the Ginchy–Morval road.) Part of the 47th Brigade had been relieved overnight but the 59th Brigade troops were still present. During the afternoon only patrols advanced, reaching a line west of Leuze Wood to the north-west to the Guillemont road; German sniping from Ginchy stopped troops advancing along the railway. The 59th Brigade was relieved overnight in heavy rain by part of the 49th Brigade. In the early hours of 5 September, the 5th Division captured the rest of Falfemont Farm and patrolled towards Point 48, sending troops down Combles ravine, to link with the French at the railway in Savernake Wood and the 95th Brigade in Leuze Wood, reports reaching the 5th Division headquarters at 11:45 a.m., recommending that the advance continue. Rawlinson ordered an advance into Leuze Wood and the higher ground towards Ginchy. At 4:00 p.m. an attack on Combles Trench failed, as unseen wire was encountered in standing crops, as did a second attempt at 7:30 p.m. In the north the 95th Brigade advance into Leuze Wood was unopposed.

The 20th Division was relieved by the 16th (Irish) Division during the morning and posts along the Guillemont–Leuze Wood road linked by a continuous trench, a battalion linking with the 5th Division in Leuze Wood. In the early morning of 6 September, as the rain stopped, the 56th Division relief of the 5th Division south of Leuze Wood, was interrupted by a German counter-attack. On the left, the 95th Brigade was relieved by the 49th Brigade, which crossed the Combles–Ginchy road and entered Bouleaux Wood, as German artillery bombarded the spur south-west of Leuze Wood all day. As night fell, the 5th Division relief continued, despite a German counter-attack and by 10:30 p.m., the attack had been repulsed, the 56th Division completing the relief early on 7 September. Patrols on the left of the 16th (Irish) Division attempting to advance along the railway, were stopped by fire from the Quadrilateral and the 48th Brigade received continuous shellfire as the fighting in Ginchy continued. At 3:00 p.m., the 48th and 49th brigades began to advance at the brigade boundary, the 49th Brigade moving the left flank to face north-east and the 48th Brigade being stopped by fire from the Quadrilateral and Ginchy.

=== Air operations ===
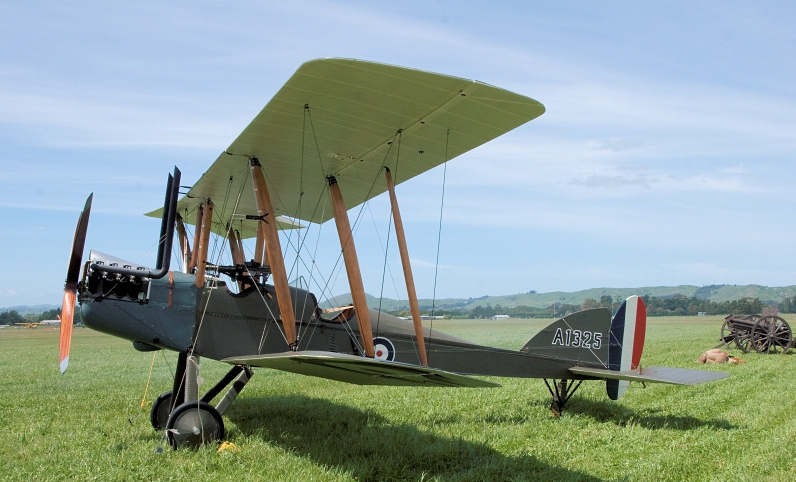
B.E.2f (A1325 in 2009).

German infantry were under constant observation from aircraft and balloons, which directed huge amounts of artillery-fire accurately onto their positions and made many machine-gun attacks. Infantry Regiment 68 ordered that men in shell-holes should dig fox-holes or cover themselves with earth for camouflage and sentries were to keep still, to avoid being seen. The German air effort in July and August was almost wholly defensive, which led to harsh criticism from the ground troops and ineffectual attempts to counter Anglo-French aerial dominance, which dissipated German air strength to no effect. A fiasco occurred on 22 July, when photographic reconnaissance aircraft were sent to engage a British aircraft, which turned out to be a German Albatros. The effect of Anglo-French artillery observation aircraft was considered brilliant, annihilating German artillery and attacking infantry from very low altitude, causing severe anxiety among German troops, who began to treat all aircraft as Allied and led to a belief that Anglo-French aircraft were armoured. Attempts to help the infantry by redeploying German aircraft, resulted in many losses for no result and further undermined relations between the infantry and Die Fliegertruppen des deutschen Kaiserreiches (Imperial German Flying Corps). German artillery units preferred direct protection of their batteries, to artillery observation flights which led to more losses, as German aircraft were inferior to their opponents as well as outnumbered. Slow production of German aircraft exacerbated equipment problems, which led to German air squadrons being equipped with a motley of designs, until the arrival of Jagdstaffel 2 under Oswald Boelcke, equipped with the Halberstadt D.II, which regained a measure of air superiority in August.

The attack on 30 July took place in a fog which grounded British aircraft until about 10:00 a.m. when 9 Squadron sent all of its aircraft on artillery observation, contact patrol and photographic reconnaissance. German artillery-fire had increased so much that ground communication failed, which made contact patrols and counter-battery artillery observation much more important. On 8 August, a 9 Squadron aircraft flew for 2 1/2 hours, searching for mirror-flashes from British troops and delivered a map to the Corps headquarters; the same crew patrolled in the afternoon and found the headquarters of the three attacking battalions, which were still cut off from ground communication. On 18 August the afternoon attack on Guillemont was observed by a 9 Squadron crew during another 2 1/2 hour flight, which called for fire on a trench full of Germans near Ginchy, as other aircraft located signalling panels and ground sheets identifying the attacking battalion headquarters, which showed that the right-hand division had failed to reach its objectives and aircrews also made machine-gun attacks on parties of German infantry in and around the front line. Observations early next day indicated that the Germans were making small withdrawals, which continued over the next two days and were seen by crews from 34 Squadron, 3 Squadron and 9 Squadron, many descending below 500 ft (150 m) to observe.

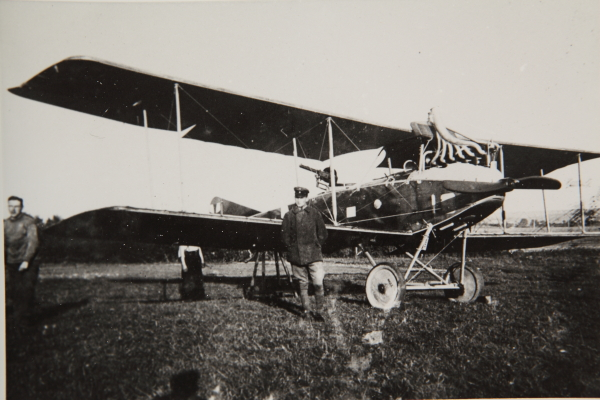
Albatros C.III observation aircraft, 1916

On the night 28/29 August, airship S. S. 40 made a four-hour reconnaissance but having to fly above 8,000 ft (2,400 m) to avoid ground-fire, found that little could be observed on the ground. A storm on 29 August blew down a 21 Squadron hangar, in which five B.E. 2c's were destroyed and nine damaged. On 3 September the attack on Guillemont was observed by 9 Squadron aircraft. A contact patrol from noon to 3:00 p.m. watched British troops advance on Guillemont and German troops send up distress flares, when they withdrew from the village and the trenches between Guillemont and Wedge Wood. Just after 2:00 p.m. British mirror flashes were seen along the eastern edge of Guillemont and after another half-hour, more were seen at Wedge Wood and the Ginchy road, up to the Leuze Wood–Guillemont crossroads. Further south the 5th Division was seen to be held up before Falfemont Farm, where the crew descended and attacked a German machine-gun detachment holding up the British advance. Later contact patrols revealed that Falfemont Farm was not captured but that to the north ground had been consolidated. The farm was attacked again in the afternoon of 4 September, as 9 Squadron observed and a message was sent to the British artillery when German troops were seen to leave a quarry near the farm and take position in shell-holes nearby, which was followed by a "curtain of fire" falling on the German positions. More reports showed that the left of the 5th Division had reached Leuze Wood. Falfemont Farm was captured in the early hours of 7 September.

=== German 1st Army ===
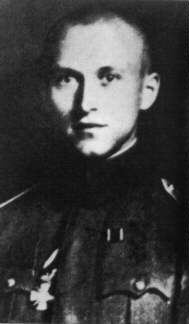
Ernst Jünger, Hanoverian Infantry Regiment 73, 111th Division.

The fall of Trônes Wood on 14 July, exposed Guillemont to attack and British heavy artillery shells began falling on the village soon after. By 20 July, the shelling had smashed road surfaces and cratered adjacent fields; a super-heavy 380 mm (15 in) gun fired a shell into the village every few minutes day and night. Most of the 8th Bavarian Reserve Division, relieved the 123rd Division around Maurepas in shell-hole positions. Reserve Infantry Regiment 104 held Guillemont and Reserve Jäger Regiment 13 the trenches in front of Ginchy, which were "destroyed" by the British bombardment. The commander of III Battalion, Reserve Infantry Regiment 104 was cut off, until a counter-attack by the regimental storm-troops reached the headquarters, while some of the British held out until 2:00 p.m., before surrendering when their ammunition ran out. Part of the regiment also counter-attacked towards Waterlot Farm and was stopped by British machine-gun fire.

A detached regiment of the 8th Bavarian Reserve Division, was returned from Barleux on the south bank, to relieve exhausted battalions of the rest of the division. The northern flank of the British attack, penetrated the junction of I Battalion, Bavarian Reserve Infantry Regiment 22 and Saxon Reserve Infantry Regiment 107, before being forced back by7:30 a.m. A local counter-attack on the north-east of Guillemont at the same time, was repulsed and when the fog lifted at 8:30 a.m., four companies of Saxon Reserve Infantry Regiment 107 advanced from Ginchy with part of Reserve Jäger Regiment 13, as three companies of Reserve Infantry Regiment 104 attacked from the east, eventually overwhelming the British party in the village during the afternoon.

The area from Maurepas to Guillemont and Ginchy, was taken over by the 27th Division which was still contained four regiments. North of the Somme, the French attacked the positions of Reserve Infantry Regiment 17, on high ground around Hem during 7 August. In a combined Franco-British attack on 12 August, the British infantry reached Guillemont but two battalions diverged. German troops made their way north-east through the gap, to re-establish the front line, as other units advanced from the village, where the dug-outs had several exits. III Battalion, Infantry regiment 124 engaged the British in the village, as III Battalion, Infantry Regiment 123 was pushed back into Guillemont, by an attack from the north. When II Battalion, Infantry Regiment 124 and II Battalion, Grenadier Regiment 123 arrived, the counter-attack was resumed and gradually overran the British in and around the village. The southern part of Maurepas and the cemetery were lost, after 36 hours of battle, when German artillery-support failed due to lack of observation. The area between Cléry and Maurepas had been held and counter-attacks were made by the 5th Bavarian Reserve Division, which was rushed forward after 13 August, to reinforce the defence. A British document was captured near Guillemont, containing German phrases intended to mislead the defence. On 16 August, Infantry Regiment 127 was relieved by battalions of regiments 123 and 124, which had only been withdrawn four days earlier. By 18 August, when the division had lost 3,590 casualties, the British attacked again.

In the late evening of 23 August, German artillery bombarded the British front from the French boundary westwards. An hour later, patrols went forward as the 26th Division and 27th Division of XIII Württemberg Corps were being relieved by Gruppe Kirchbach with the 111th Division and the 56th Division, from Angle Wood to Longueval. The 27th Division was relieved after 25 days, except for the artillery which stayed for eight weeks, losing 318 casualties and 160 guns to mechanical faults and counter-battery fire. One field regiment was engaged from 25 July to the end of September, losing 393 casualties, 71 guns were made unserviceable, while firing more than 500,000 shells.. The 1st Guard Division and 2nd Guard Division between Le Forêt and Maurepas, were attacked late in the afternoon but eventually drove of the French infantry; between Cléry, Bouchavesnes and Le Forêt, fighting continued.

On 3 September, Cléry and Guillemont to the north, fell, a severe blow to morale; Hindenburg and Ludendorff ended the policy of defending ground at all costs on 5 September and ordered the construction of the Siegfriedstellung (Hindenburg Line) 20 mi (32 km) to the east. Falfemont Farm was held by Infantry Regiment 164 of the 111th Division, with Guard Grenadier Regiment 4 of the 2nd Guard Division to the south-east. Fusilier Regiment 73, on the right of the 111th Division, was distributed in depth, the II Battalion and a machine-gun company in Guillemont and the III Battalion between Leuze Wood and the Quadrilateral. The I Battalion was caught by the British bombardment of the village and overwhelmed by 2:30 p.m., the III Battalion being prevented from counter-attacking by the British barrage. A gap appeared between Infantry Regiment 164 and Fusilier Regiment 73, I Battalion being taken by surprise and almost "annihilated"; more than 700 soldiers were captured and many were killed. The II and III battalions of Fusilier Regiment 73, attempted a morning counter-attack from Leuze Wood but were stopped by British artillery. The I and III battalions of Infantry Regiment 76 held the trench between Leuze Wood and the Quadrilateral and gained touch with Fusilier Regiment 73 during the night, when part of the III Battalion of Reserve Infantry Regiment 107 of the 24th Reserve Division arrived to fill the gap.

== Aftermath ==
=== Analysis ===
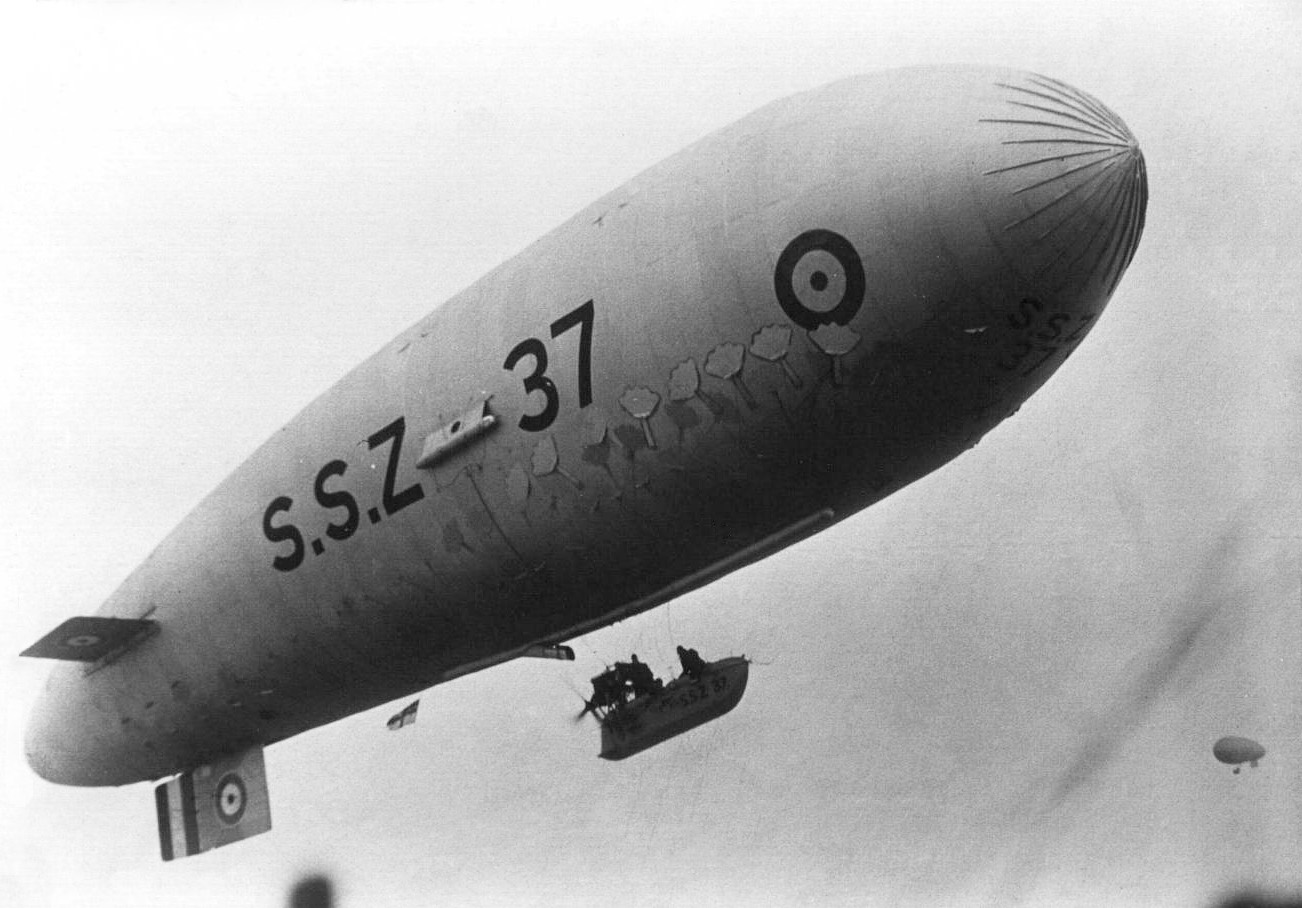
S.S. class airship.

In 2001, Peter Liddle wrote that beyond imposing a delay, the German policy of unyielding defence and counter-attack failed and ought to be judged on the same terms as British and French methods. Haig and Joffre were right to believe that a serious German collapse was possible until late July and a convincing alternative to attrition in the circumstances of late July – early September 1916, has not been proposed. In 2009, William Philpott criticised the weeks of costly, small, narrow-front attacks against a skilful and determined defence by the Germans, yet Gallwitz "had no better tactical method", which reduced operations to a battle of wills. In the Fourth Army area from 15 July to 4 September, 72 German counter-attacks were made against 90 British attacks, exposing German infantry to similar costly and frustrating failures. German artillery and air inferiority was a great disadvantage and led to constant losses. In 2011, Gary Sheffield wrote that analysis of captured documents and prisoner interrogations indicated the strain being imposed on the German army.

In 2006, Jack Sheldon also wrote that Allied aerial dominance in August put the Germans at a serious tactical disadvantage, that some troops began to avoid the remaining dugouts and that much of the Entente artillery was used constantly to bombard targets deep behind German lines. J. P. Harris wrote in 2009, that on the German side, conditions were worse and the British improved the accuracy of their artillery-fire, with the help of aircraft observation. At the end of August, Falkenhayn was dismissed, partly due to disagreements over his conduct of the defence of the Somme. Few writers in English have compared the British experience with that of the French Sixth Army. The large British effort on the Somme helped to preserve relations with the French, although Joffre deprecated British the piecemeal attacks of late July to early September.

Robert A. Doughty wrote in 2005, that the French on the Somme had failed to combine their attacks with the British and in early September attacked sequentially. Joffre ordered the French offensive to continue as long as weather allowed and in September and October, French attacks were as piecemeal as the British. In 2005, Prior and Wilson analysed the British on the Somme from 15 July to 12 September, which included the fighting for Guillemont. After sixty days, thirty-two British divisions had been engaged and lost 126,000 men, the British were bogged down, having advanced 1,000–1,500 yd (910–1,370 m) on a 12,000 yd (6.8 mi; 11 km) front and the deeper advance at Guillemont had only occurred at the end of the period. On fifty days, an average of eight divisions were in the line but fewer than six battalions attacked and only twice did more than half of the battalions in the line attack. British assaults were constant, small and narrow-front affairs, against which the Germans could concentrate artillery and inflict many casualties. British divisions stayed in the front line from two to 42 days and casualties varied from 500 per day in the 5th Division, to fewer than 100 per day in the 23rd Division.

Prior and Wilson wrote that the 1st Division attacked fourteen times, yet six divisions attacked only once; single attacks were made by 164 battalions, three were made by 24 battalions and one battalion attacked six times. Some of the difference is explained by divisions having been engaged from 1 to 14 July but the rest is called "whim", with no pattern in the direction or frequency of attacks or the time divisions spent in the line. (Note: The tactical need to attack on broad front, to disperse German artillery and machine-gun fire and the practical need to avoid dispersing British fire-power, when so many guns were mechanically defective, ammunition was unreliable, the delivery of shells to gun positions was intermittent and when 50 per cent more ammunition had been fired in July than was received from Britain is not mentioned.) The large number of small uncoordinated attacks, when it was not possible to protect infantry with creeping barrages, demonstrated a failure of duty by the British commanders, inexperience in the command of large forces and the impossibility of predicting the warfare of the Western Front, partly explain British failures.

The Germans had recovered from the defeats in the south in July, many defensive positions were out of view of the British artillery and at times poor weather grounded British artillery observation aircraft. The salient at Delville Wood was exposed to German artillery-fire from the north and east and could only be eliminated by an advance at Guillemont, yet of seventy Fourth Army attacks, only twenty were against Guillemont. The attack of 22/23 July was "tactically dubious", despite being a broad front attack co-ordinated with the French. Zero hour was 1:30 a.m. on 23 July but two divisions made zero hour 3:40 a.m. to conform to the French, who then cancelled their attack. The co-ordinated attack planned by the French Sixth Army, Fourth and Reserve armies became uncoordinated minor attacks, at 10:00 p.m., 12:30 a.m., 1:30 a.m. and 3:40 a.m., the first serving to alert the Germans.

British artillery had good observation over the German defences at Guillemont but the German infantry dispersed into shell-holes, which nullified the effect of much of the artillery-fire. (Note: In spite of improvisation and inexperience, in 1916 British war industry produced 33,507 machine-guns, 5,192 trench mortars with 6,500,000 rounds, 127,000 long tons (129,000 t) of explosives and 84,000 long tons (85,000 t) of propellants. Mills bomb production rose to 1,400,000 per week and the output of shells rose from 4,336,800 in the first quarter of 1916 to 20,888,400 in the final quarter, for an annual total of more than fifty million. 148,000 long tons (150,000 t) of ammunition were expended on the Somme from 24 June to 23 July and 101,771 long tons (103,404 t) were landed in France. Heavy guns and howitzers burst on firing, due to defective shells made from inferior steel, which had more hairline cracks, through which the propellant discharge detonated the shell. 8-inch howitzer fuzes failed so often that the battlefield was littered with duds and an attempted cure made the fuzes fall out. Many shells failed to explode, due to deterioration of the explosive filling and defective fuzes in all heavy guns caused premature detonations, while many guns misfired due to poor quality barrels. 60-pounder guns averaged a premature every 500 shrapnel rounds and 4.5-inch howitzer shells exploded in the barrel or 4–5 yd (3.7–4.6 m) beyond the muzzle, the crews becoming known as "suicide clubs". Some propellants were not fully consumed on firing, requiring the barrel to be cleaned after each shot, which slowed the rate of fire. Some copper driving bands on 18-pounder field gun shells were too hard and reduced the accuracy of the gun and when High Explosive ammunition was introduced late in 1915, premature detonations and bulges occurred with a burst barrel every thousand shots. There was a shortage of spare buffer springs, replacements were sometimes worse than worn ones and spare parts for every mechanical device in the army were lacking. Some shells exuded explosive in the summer heat, flare fillings decomposed, phosphorus bombs went off spontaneously and the firing mechanism of the heavy trench mortars failed on 1 July. Stokes mortar ammunition was chronically unreliable until replaced by improved designs, many Mills bombs went off early, rifle grenades were either premature detonations or duds and rifle cartridges from one manufacturer jammed after firing and had to be scrapped.) British infantry reached the village several times and were then trapped by fire, from shell-hole positions on both flanks and from ahead. (Note: British and French defensive methods on the Somme have received little scholarly attention but dispersion and defence in depth was also practised.) Wilfred Miles, the official historian, wrote that the attacks on 23 and 30 July failed because an attack from west and south-west, with no French supporting attack at Maurepas Ravine to the south, could not succeed. Philpott called hand grenades the main weapon and the side which won the bombing fight usually prevailed, which at Guillemont in August was the German, the British being "finished off with grenades and cold steel".

Prior and Wilson called Haig's instructions of 2 August, for "careful and methodical" attacks, "pushed forward without delay" so ambiguous as to be incomprehensible and Rawlinson incapable of implementing them. Sheffield wrote that criticism of directives from Haig, underestimated the difficulty in balancing tactical, operational and strategic demands. Line straightening attacks were costly but were better than imposing complicated manoeuvres on the infantry. After the failure on 8 August, Haig ordered Rawlinson to plan an attack on a wide front, combined with the French. On 11 August, Haig and Joffre agreed a joint attack by the French Sixth and British Fourth armies on Maurepas and Guillemont. The attack was delayed by rain and supply difficulties, then French co-operation was cancelled again. On 18 August, the 3rd Division was "shattered" and the only success was obtained by the 24th Division, behind a creeping barrage; the British returned to smaller attacks. On 24 August, Haig criticised Rawlinson for failing to supervise planning and for attacking on narrow fronts with insufficient forces. Sheffield blamed Rawlinson who had "abdicated responsibility" and called Haig's directive a "Boy's Own" guide to command.

An attack was postponed until 3 September, when Falfemont Farm, Leuze Wood and Guillemont were captured, in an advance of 4,500 yd (2.6 mi; 4.1 km) on a 2,000 yd (1,800 m) front, which eliminated the salient at Delville Wood and exposed Ginchy to attack from the south. Harris also considered that pressure on Rawlinson from Haig led to the capture of Guillemont but criticised Haig for ignorance of the climate of the Somme region, where the weather usually broke around 25 September. Philpott doubted the existence of a "learning curve" but wrote that British methods improved, with principles devised for dealing with isolated German machine-guns, attacks in waves followed by small groups of supporting troops and consolidation of captured ground, spread through the BEF, although fresh divisions had to learn the same lessons, also evident in some French Tenth Army divisions on the south bank. Many errors were made by over promoted and inexperienced officers, while others like Horne, Congreve and Cavan, proved themselves to be talented corps commanders.

=== Casualties ===
The 2nd Division suffered 4,908 casualties from 24 July to 11 August. The 3rd Division had 6,102 casualties from 14 to 27 July and c. 1,900 more casualties from 14 to 20 August. From 26 August to 7 September the 5th Division lost 4,233 casualties and from 23 August to 7 September the 7th Division lost 3,800 men. The 20th Division suffered 2,959 casualties from 22 August to 8 September. Casualties in the 24th Division during August were 3,537 men and the division lost c. 2,000 casualties in September. The 30th Division lost 2,777 casualties in the fighting around Guillemont and the 55th (West Lancashire) Division lost 4,126 casualties in August. The British had suffered 130,000 casualties by the end of July and French casualties reached 24,600 men by the third week of July. At the end of August, British casualties had increased to 251,000 men and French to 65,000. In September, French casualties on the Somme had increased to 76,147 men, the most costly month of the battle. German casualties on the Somme during August were c. 80,000, substantially fewer than in July (40,187 casualties in the first ten days) and in September were c. 135,000, the worst month of the battle. From 14 to 31 July the 24th Reserve Division had 5,476 casualties.

=== Subsequent operations ===
After the divisional reliefs on 6 September, the British continued their advance south of Ginchy as the French Sixth Army pushed eastwards from Maurepas. On 8 September the 168th Brigade of the 56th (1/1st London) Division was relieved by the 169th Brigade in Leuze Wood, which gained touch with the French troops in Combles ravine and bombed down Combles Trench until forced back by a German counter-attack at 5:15 a.m. To the west, the 16th (Irish) Division abandoned an advanced trench near the Quadrilateral. Ginchy had been exposed to attack from the south and was captured in the Battle of Ginchy on 9 September. After British attacks by the Reserve Army on the Ancre (3 to 14 September) and French attacks by the Tenth and Sixth armies from 4 to 12 September, the Fourth Army attacked again at the Battle of Flers-Courcelette (15 to 22 September), the Germans holding on to the Quadilateral until 18 September.

== See also ==
=== Victoria Cross ===
- CSM George Evans, 18th (Service) Battalion, Manchester Regiment (3rd City), 30th Division
- 2nd Lieutenant Gabriel Coury, 1/4th Battalion, South Lancashire Regiment (Pioneers), 55th (West Lancashire) Division
- Captain Noel Godfrey Chavasse, 1/10th (Scottish) Battalion, King's (Liverpool Regiment), 55th (West Lancashire) Division
- Private Thomas Hughes, 6th (Service) Battalion, Connaught Rangers, 16th (Irish) Division
- Lieutenant John Vincent Holland, 7th Battalion, Prince of Wales's Leinster Regiment (Royal Canadians), 16th (Irish) Division
- Sergeant David Jones, 12th (Service) Battalion, King's (Liverpool Regiment), 20th (Light) Division
