= David Jones (VC) =

English recipient of the Victoria Cross

Serjeant David Jones VC
- David Jones as depicted on a cigarette card
- Born: 10 January 1892; Liverpool, Lancashire, England
- Died: 7 October 1916 (aged 24) †; Bancourt, France
- Burial place: Bancourt British Cemetery
- Military career
- Allegiance: United Kingdom
- Branch: British Army
- Rank: Sergeant
- Units: The King's (Liverpool) Regiment
- Conflicts: World War I: Battle of Loos; Battle of the Somme; Battle of Guillemont; Battle of Le Transloy †
- Awards: Victoria Cross

David Jones VC (10 January 1892 – 7 October 1916) was an English recipient of the Victoria Cross, the highest and most prestigious award for gallantry in the face of the enemy that can be awarded to British and Commonwealth forces. A soldier with The King's (Liverpool) Regiment during the First World War, he was awarded the VC for his actions in September 1916, during the Battle of the Somme. He was killed in action several days later.

== Early life ==
David Jones was born in Liverpool on 10 January 1892 to David Jones, a trained ironworker but working as a porter at the time, and Jessie Jones née Ginochio. The youngest of six siblings, Jones went to Heyworth Street School in Everton. When he finished his schooling, he was apprenticed to Blake's Motor Company to train as a mechanic. In 1909, he volunteered for the Territorial Force and served in the 9th King's (Liverpool) Regiment for four years.

== First World War ==
On the outbreak of the First World War, Jones enlisted in the British Army, and was posted to the 12th Battalion, The King's (Liverpool) Regiment. After a period of training, he, along with the battalion as part of the 20th (Light) Division, was sent to the Western Front in France in June 1915. Before his departure, he married Elizabeth née Doyle. The marital home was in Everton.

Jones was involved in the Battle of Loos in September–October 1915 and later served in the Ypres Salient in Belgium the following year. The 20th Division was among those tasked for the Battle of the Somme, and from 22 August 1916 it served in the Somme sector in France. On 3 September 1916, it was tasked with the capture of the village of Guillemont, which was strongly garrisoned by German forces. Jones was by now a sergeant. His platoon was part of a company ordered forward to strengthen the flank but it became cut off. Its commanding officer killed, for two days, under Jones's command, the trapped platoon resisted German attempts to capture their position. Even when relieved by units of the 16th (Irish) Division, he remained in the line for several hours before withdrawing. For his actions, he was awarded the VC. The VC, instituted in 1856, was the highest award for valour that could be bestowed on a soldier of the British Empire. The citation for his VC read as follows:

For most conspicuous bravery and devotion to duty, and the ability displayed in the handling of his platoon. The platoon to which he belonged was ordered to a forward position and during the advance came under heavy machine-gun fire, the officer being killed and the platoon suffering heavy losses. Serjeant Jones led forward the remainder, occupied the position, and held it for two days and two nights, without food or water, until relieved. On the second day he drove back three counter-attacks, inflicting heavy losses. His coolness was most praiseworthy. It was due entirely to his resource and example that his men retained confidence and their post.

— The London Gazette, 26 October 1916

After some days' rest, the 20th Division was then involved in the next phase of fighting on the Somme, the Battle of Le Transloy. On the opening day of the battle, 7 October 1916, Jones was killed in action. His battalion had just reached and entered some German trenches. He is buried in Bancourt British Cemetery.

== Medals and legacy ==
King George V presented Jones's VC to his widow on 31 March 1917, in a ceremony at Buckingham Palace. It was owned for several years by his former employer, Blake's Motor Company, which had been gifted it by Jones's widow. It was loaned to the King's Regimental Museum before it was donated in 2009 to the Museum of Liverpool, where it is displayed at its premises in Pierhead, Liverpool.

The year after his death, two separate plaques in his memory were constructed at his former school, Heyworth Street School. One was later moved to Everton Catholic Primary School while the other is in storage. Other memorials exist at St Nathaniel's in Liverpool and Guillemont Church. The latter also commemorates John Holland and Thomas Hughes, two other VC recipients from the Battle of Guillemont.
