= Bancourt British Cemetery =

CWGC cemetery in Pas-de-Calais, France

- Commonwealth War Graves Commission
- Used for those deceased 1916–1918
- Established: September 1918
- Location: 50°06′09″N 02°53′45″E near Bapaume, France
- Designed by: Sir Edwin Lutyens
- Total burials: 2,480
- Unknowns: 1,462

Burials by nation
- Allied Powers: United Kingdom: 679; New Zealand: 171; Australia: 161; Canada: 11; Unknown 1,462

Burials by war
- First World War: 2,480

Bancourt British Cemetery is a Commonwealth War Graves Commission burial ground for the dead of the First World War located in the Pas de Calais region of France, on the Western Front.

== History ==
The village of Bancourt is to the east of Bapaume, the scene of fighting in April 1918, during the German spring offensive, which saw it captured by the Germans. It was retaken by soldiers of the New Zealand Division in late August 1918 during the Second Battle of Bapaume.

== Foundation ==
The cemetery was established in September 1918 by the New Zealand Division and initially covered the area that is now defined as Plot I, rows A and B. It was expanded after the war as it received the remains from other cemeteries in the area as they were consolidated here. These consolidated cemeteries included Bapaume Reservoir German Cemetery, Bapaume Road Cemetery, three cemeteries from along the Beaulencourt Road and Cloudy Trench Cemetery. Most of the interments were for soldiers killed during the fighting in the area in April 1918 when the Germans launched their Spring Offensive, and then August–September 1918, during the Hundred Days Offensive. However, it also contains numerous graves of men killed in the winter of 1916–1917.

== Cemetery ==
Designed by the English architect Sir Edwin Lutyens and administered by the Commonwealth War Graves Commission, the Bancourt British Cemetery is located off the D7 road, to the east of Bancourt. The entrance is along the south wall. A Cross of Sacrifice is positioned at the northern end of the cemetery while a Stone of Remembrance is located close to the entry. Bancourt's communal cemetery is on the opposite side of the road.

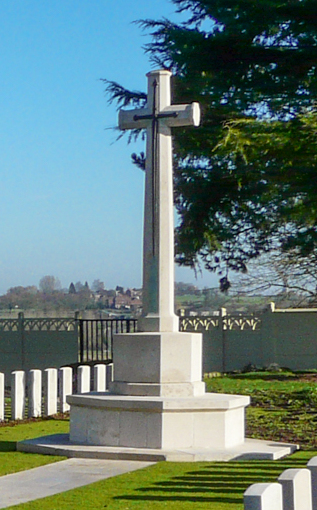
An example of a Cross of Sacrifice similar to that of Bancourt British Cemetery; the one shown is from Bethencourt Communal Cemetery, several kilometres to the east of Bancourt

The cemetery contains the remains of 2,480 soldiers, 1,462 of them unidentified. The majority of the identified burials are those from the United Kingdom but 171 soldiers of the New Zealand Expeditionary Force are also buried at Bancourt alongside 161 soldiers of the Australian Imperial Force. Eleven Canadian soldiers are identified as being interred at the cemetery. There is also a special memorial to 43 soldiers believed to be among the unidentified burials as well as to a soldier's grave in a German military cemetery which was unable to be located during the consolidation phase. These can be found along the northern wall, behind the Cross of Sacrifice. A notable burial at Bancourt is Sergeant David Jones, a Victoria Cross recipient who was killed in action on 7 October 1916.
