= List of battalions of the Connaught Rangers =

This is a list of battalions of the Connaught Rangers, which existed as an infantry regiment of the British Army from 1881 to 1922.

== Original composition ==
When the 88th Regiment of Foot (Connaught Rangers), and 94th Regiment of Foot amalgamated to form The Connaught Rangers in 1881 under the Cardwell-Childers reforms of the British Armed Forces, four pre-existent militia regiments of Connaught were integrated into the structure of the regiment. The only change to the regiment's structure during the period of 1881-1908 occurred in 1889, when the 6th (Militia) Battalion was absorbed by the 3rd (Militia) Battalions.

Battalion	Formed	Formerly
Regular
1st	1793	88th Regiment of Foot (Connaught Rangers)
2nd	1823	94th Regiment of Foot
Militia
3rd (Militia)	1793	South Mayo Rifles Regiment of Militia
4th (Militia)	1793	Galway Regiment of Militia
5th (Militia)		Roscommon Regiment of Militia
6th (Militia)		North Mayo Fusiliers Regiment of Militia

== Reorganisation ==
In 1908, the militia battalions transferred to the "Special Reserve", alongside this, the 3rd (Militia) Battalion disbanded, and the 2 Battalions were renumbered sequentially.

Battalion	Formerly
3rd (Reserve)	4th (Militia) Battalion
4th (Extra Reserve)	5th (Militia) Battalion

== First World War ==
The Connaughts fielded 6 battalions and lost approximately 2,500 officers and other ranks during the course of the war. Two battalions of the regiment were formed as part of Secretary of State for War Lord Kitchener's appeal for an initial 100,000 men volunteers in 1914.

Battalion	Formed	Served	Fate
Regular
1st	1793	Western Front, Mesopotamia, Palestine	
2nd	1823	Western Front	Amalgamated with 1st Battalion, in November 1914.
Special Reserve
3rd (Reserve)	1793	Ireland, Britain	
4th (Extra Reserve)		Ireland, Britain	Absorbed by 3rd (Reserve) Battalion, in May 1918
Territorial Force
5th (Service)	Dublin, August 1914	Gallipoli, Salonika, Palestine, Western Front	See Disbandment
6th (Service)	Kilworth, September 1914	Western Front	Disbanded, in August 1918

== Disbandment ==
In 1919, the 2nd Battalion was reformed, by redesignation of the 5th (Service) Battalion. And in 1921, the Special Reserve reverted to its militia designation.

Following the establishment of the Irish Free State in 1922, the regiment disbanded, along with the other five regiments that had their traditional recruiting grounds in the counties of the new state.
