= Peace feeler =

A peace feeler is, in diplomacy, a means of determining whether a warring party is prepared to end hostilities. William Safire defines it as "a diplomatic probe, real or imagined, to end hostilities."
