= Samuel Rabin (artist) =

English artist, actor and wrestler (1903–1991)

- Rabin at the 1928 Olympics

Personal information
- Born: Samuel Rabinowich; 20 June 1903 Cheetham, North Manchester, England
- Died: 20 December 1991 (aged 88) Poole, Dorset, England
- Education: Manchester Municipal School of Art; Slade School of Fine Art
- Occupations: Sculptor, Artist, Art Teacher, Singer, Film Actor, Boxer
- Spouses: Ida Lilly Shuster, Frances Kaye
- Children: 1
Medal record
Men's freestyle wrestling
Representing Great Britain
Olympic Games
| Bronze medal – third place | 1928 Amsterdam | Middleweight |

Samuel (Sam) Rabin, originally Samuel Rabinovitch, (20 June 1903 – 20 December 1991) was an English sculptor, artist, film actor, art teacher, singer, boxer, wrestler and a 1928 Olympic bronze medalist in Middleweight wrestling.

== Family and early life ==
Rabin, who was Jewish, was born Samuel Rabinovitch on 20 June 1903 at Dewhurst Street, Cheetham, North Manchester. He was the son of Jacob Rabinovitch (1872–1962) and Sarah Rabinovitch (née Kraselschikow, 1879–1961), both Imperial Russian Jewish exiles from Vitebsk (now in Belarus). His father was a cap cutter and later a wholesale milliner; his mother was a jewellery assembler.

During his childhood, the family moved to Salford where Rabin grew up and where his parents encouraged his talent for drawing. In 1914 Rabin won a scholarship to the Manchester Municipal School of Art making him, at the age of 11, the youngest pupil ever to attend the college. There he was taught drawing by French artist Adolphe Valette. In 1921 he moved to the Slade School of Fine Art in London where he continued his studies under Henry Tonks until 1924.

In about 1935, Rabin married Ida Lily Shuster, but they were divorced. In 1956, he married Frances Kaye (formerly Lucienne Karpeles, 1917–1988). The couple had one son, David, born in 1960.

== Career ==
After the Slade, Rabin studied in Paris where he met and was greatly impressed and influenced by sculptor Charles Despiau.

=== Sculptor ===
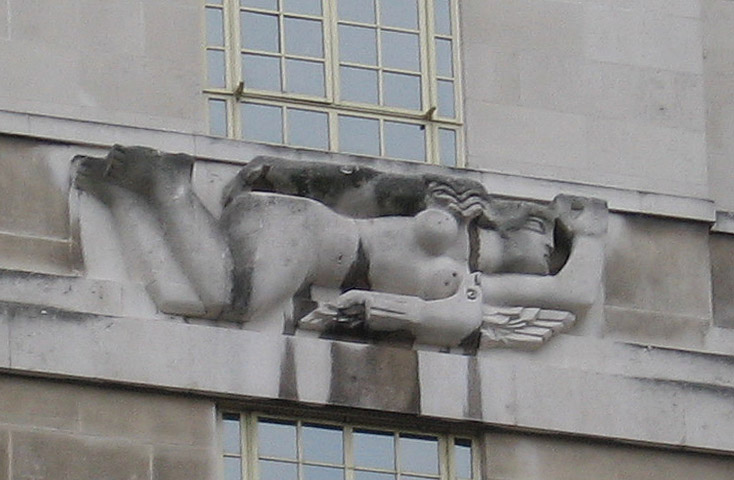
West Wind, 1928 on 55 Broadway, headquarters of London Underground

Rabin's own sculpture from this time is little known as he was a perfectionist and destroyed work that he considered unsatisfactory. In 1928, working under his full surname, he was commissioned by architect Charles Holden to carve West Wind, one of eight personifications of the four winds for the headquarters of the Underground Electric Railways Company of London at 55 Broadway. (Note: Other sculptors to provide works for the building included Jacob Epstein, Henry Moore, Eric Gill, Eric Aumonier, Allan G Wyon and Alfred Gerrard.) The sculpture was partly completed in-situ on the building. In 1930, he produced his only other public sculptures; two decorative winged masks, The Past and The Future, for the Daily Telegraph building in Fleet Street. These were carved on the building directly from the scaffold.

Both commissions were well received at the time, but Rabin was unable to make a living as a sculptor and turned to another career – wrestling, for which he abbreviated his surname.

=== Olympic bronze medal ===
Rabin was physically strong and had boxed and wrestled as an amateur to fund his art. He won a bronze medal in the middleweight division of the free-style wrestling at the 1928 Olympics in Amsterdam. Rabin turned professional in 1932 and fought as Rabin the Cat and Sam Radnor the Hebrew Jew across Britain. Alexander Korda cast him as a wrestler in The Private Life of Henry VIII in 1933 and as Mendoza, a Jewish prize-fighter, in The Scarlet Pimpernel in 1934.

=== Singer ===
During World War II, Rabin entertained troops by singing at British Army camps. After the War, he sang regularly on the BBC radio programme “Time for Music” with the London Studio Players. Rabin gave up singing and sculpturing to concentrate on drawing, with the boxing ring and its characters as the subject of most of his pieces.

Despite lacking any formal musical training, Rabin was a talented baritone and worked professionally during the 1940s singing with Stars in Battledress and sang operatic arias with the army's Classical Music Group. In 1946 he auditioned for La Scala's conductor, Victor de Sabata.

=== Art teacher ===
Left Jab, 1972, coloured pastel on board

In 1949, Rabin began teaching drawing at Goldsmiths College of Art in New Cross, London. While at Goldsmiths, he focused on what would become his best known and probably most admired subject, drawing and painting boxers. His disciplined teaching style including the production of demonstration works, followed that of his own teacher, Valette. His students included Mary Quant, Bridget Riley and Tom Keating. He left Goldsmiths in 1965, due to differences over teaching methods and taught at Bournemouth College of Art until 1985 and then at Poole Art Centre until shortly before his death in December 1991.

==== Death ====
He died on 20 December 1991 in Poole, Dorset, England, and had a private memorial service on 18 January 1992 at St. Osmund's Church at Parkstone, Dorset. Details of his death and burial were not readily available in the London Press.

== Works ==
Little of Rabin's work from before his time at Goldsmiths College survived his critical destruction and an accidental destruction by a wartime landlady. Much of what exists are figure studies prepared as demonstrations for students and coloured boxing scenes produced with thickly applied wax crayons of his own making. Rabin exhibited rarely, but had a retrospective at Dulwich Picture Gallery in 1985–86. He also exhibited at Southampton City Art Gallery 8 Feb – 23 March 1986 and Salford Art Gallery 17 April – 23 May 1986.

Collections containing his work include the British Museum, the Government Art Collection and the Musée National du Sport in Paris.

== See also ==
- List of select Jewish wrestlers

== Notes and references ==
=== Bibliography ===
- Sheeran, John (September 2004). "Rabin Samuel (1903–1991), artist and art teacher". Oxford Dictionary of National Biography (online ed.). Oxford University Press. doi:10.1093/ref:odnb/64508. (Subscription, Wikipedia Library access or UK public library membership required.)
- Taylor, Paul (2004). Jews and the Olympic Games: the clash between sport and politics. Sussex Academic Press. ISBN 1-903900-88-3.
- Ward-Jackson, Philip (2003). Public Sculpture of the City of London. Liverpool University Press. ISBN 0-85323-977-0.
