= 55 Broadway =

Building in London

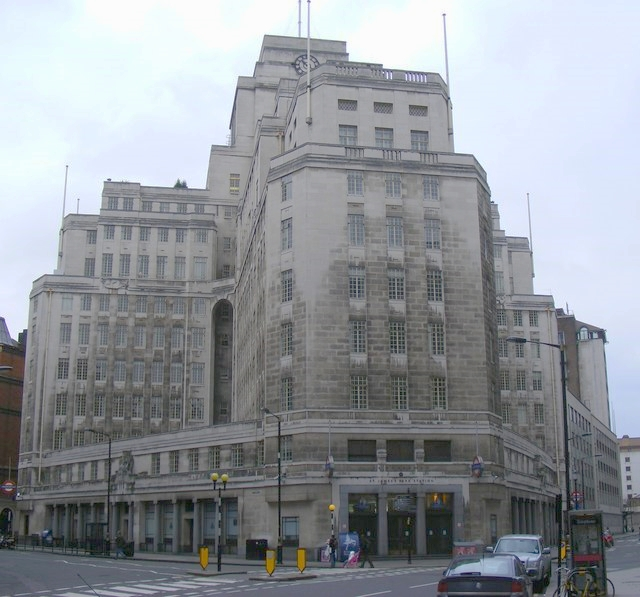
- Interactive map of 55 Broadway
- 51°29′58″N 0°08′01″W
- Location: London, SW1; United Kingdom

Site notes
- Architect: Charles Holden

Listed Building – Grade I
- Official name: London Underground Ltd headquarters including St James's Park Underground station
- Designated: 12 January 2011
- Reference no.: 1219790

55 Broadway is a Grade I listed building on Broadway close to St James's Park in London. Upon completion, it was the tallest office block in London. In 1931, the building earned architect Charles Holden the RIBA London Architecture Medal. In 2020, it was announced that it will be converted to a luxury hotel.

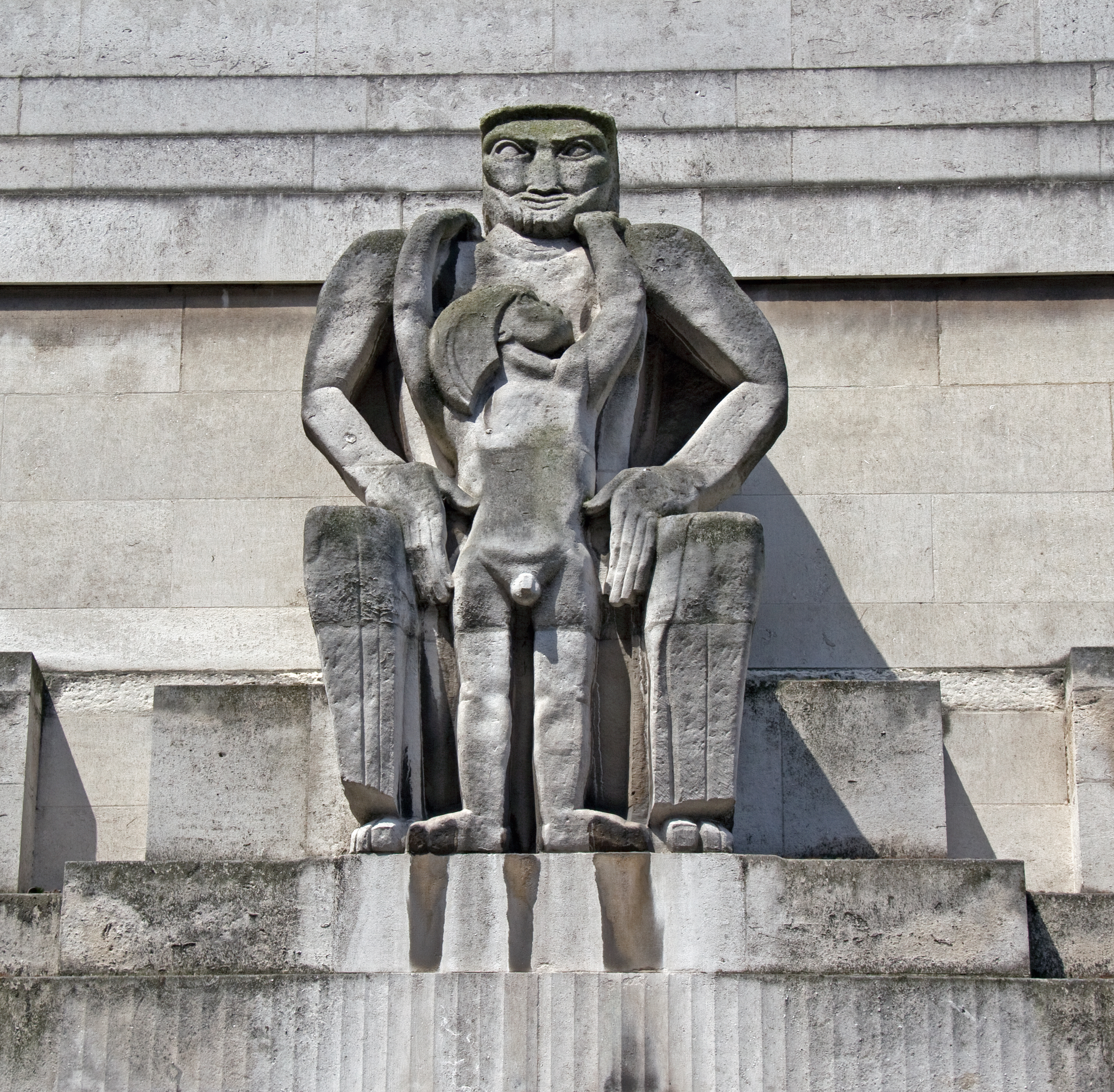
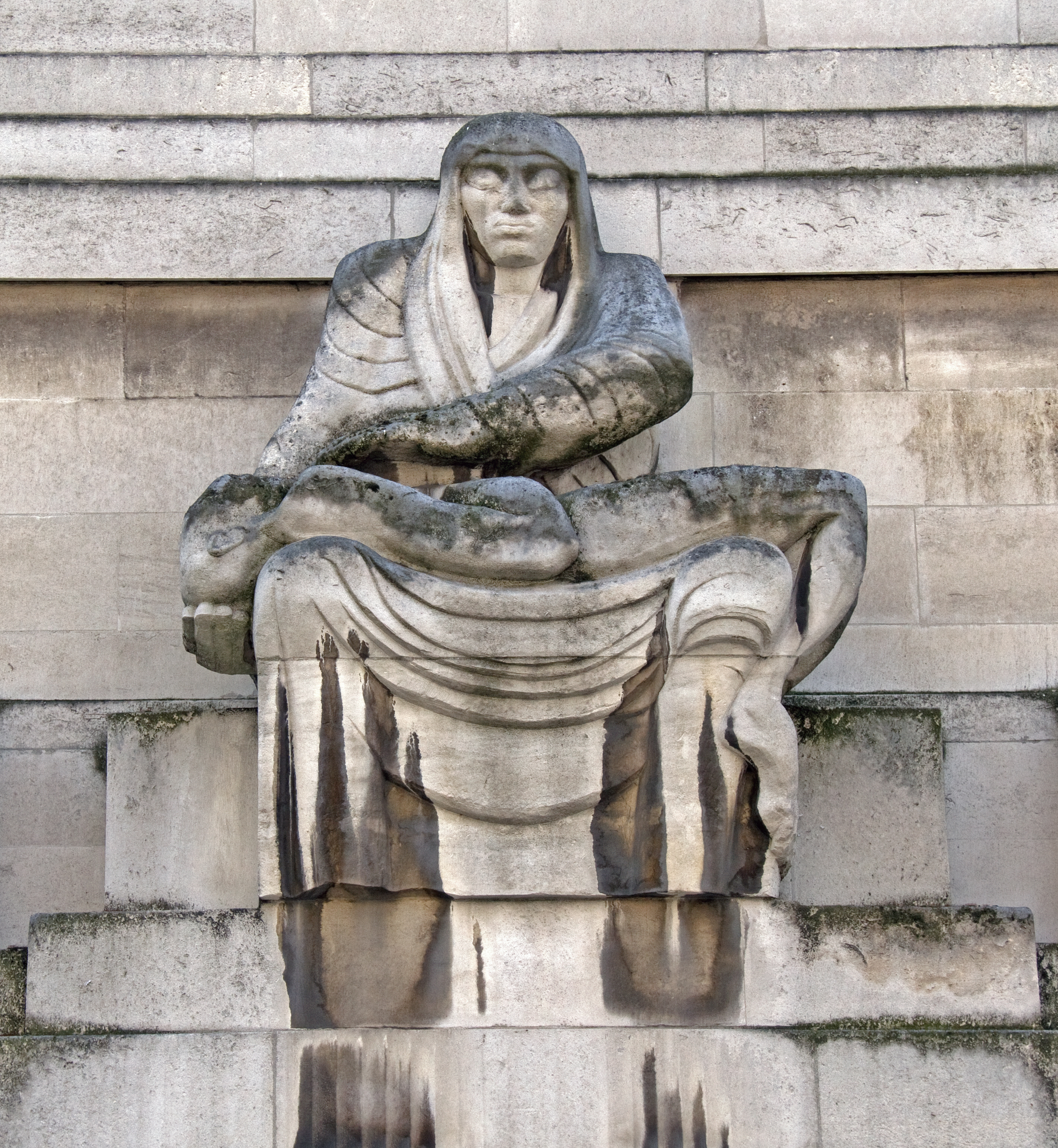
Jacob Epstein's Day and Night drew most of the criticism from the London public.

== History ==
It was designed by Charles Holden and built between 1927 and 1929 as a new headquarters for the Underground Electric Railways Company of London (UERL), the main forerunner of London Underground.

London Transport occupied the building from 1933 to 1984, followed by its successors London Regional Transport from 1984 to 2000, and Transport for London (TfL) from 2000 to 2020. TfL vacated the building in 2020.

The British Transport Commission (BTC) occupied the eighth and ninth floors from its formation at the end of 1947 until late 1953, when with the abolition of the Railway Executive (RE), the BTC moved into the RE's offices at 222 Marylebone Road.

== Description ==
Faced with Portland stone and covering a site with an irregular footprint, the upper office floors of the building are on a cruciform plan, stepping back towards the central clock tower at the top. The cruciform design afforded the optimum level of natural light to the offices. The ground floor now contains a shopping arcade and has many Art Deco details. Previously, the ground floor was also given over to London Transport offices, including a travel information centre, cash office and a library. The whole building straddles St James's Park tube station, the east and west wings being immediately above the railway tunnel. When finished, it was the tallest steel-framed office building in London, until construction of another Holden building, the University of London's Senate House (based on similar designs and materials).

On each elevation, the pediment above the sixth floor is decorated with a relief, collectively known as 'the four winds', although the four points of the compass are repeated twice for a total of eight reliefs. Each relief was carved by an avant-garde sculptor of the day.

Halfway along the north and east facades are a matched pair of sculptures, Day and Night by Jacob Epstein. The modernism and graphic nakedness of these sculptures created public outrage on their unveiling. Newspapers started a campaign to have the statues removed and one company director, Lord Colwyn, offered to pay the cost. Frank Pick, the managing director of the UERL at the time, took overall responsibility and offered his resignation over the scandal. In the end, Epstein agreed to remove 1.5 inches (38 mm) from the penis of the smaller figure on Day and ultimately the furore died down.

The function suite on the 10th floor of the building was formerly set up as a dining room for the chairman and senior executives. At this level, there are also four roof gardens, one of which was dedicated to the wife of a former managing director in recognition of her enthusiasm in encouraging this early form of environmental work.

The building, first listed as Grade II in 1970, was upgraded to Grade I in 2011.

In 2013, it was announced that 55 Broadway would be converted into luxury apartments, once London Underground moved operations from the building in 2015 to their new headquarters in the Olympic Park in Stratford. In May 2014, it was announced that the architects, TateHindle, would lead the redevelopment and, in June 2015, planning permission and listed building consent was granted: however, this was not implemented and the planning permission expired in June 2018.

In September 2019, a long-term lease of the property was sold by TfL for £120 million to Integrity International Group, founded by Tony Matharu.

In May 2020, it was announced that Blue Orchid Hotels, a subsidiary of Integrity International, would convert the structure into a luxury hotel. TfL vacated the building in 2020.

== In popular culture ==
In 2023, the building was used for the filming of the Channel 4 reality TV series Rise and Fall.

== Commissioned art work ==
- Day and Night, Jacob Epstein
- North Wind, Alfred Gerrard
- North Wind, Eric Gill
- East Wind, Eric Gill
- East Wind, Allan G. Wyon
- South Wind, Eric Gill
- South Wind, Eric Aumonier
- West Wind, Samuel Rabinovitch
- West Wind, Henry Moore
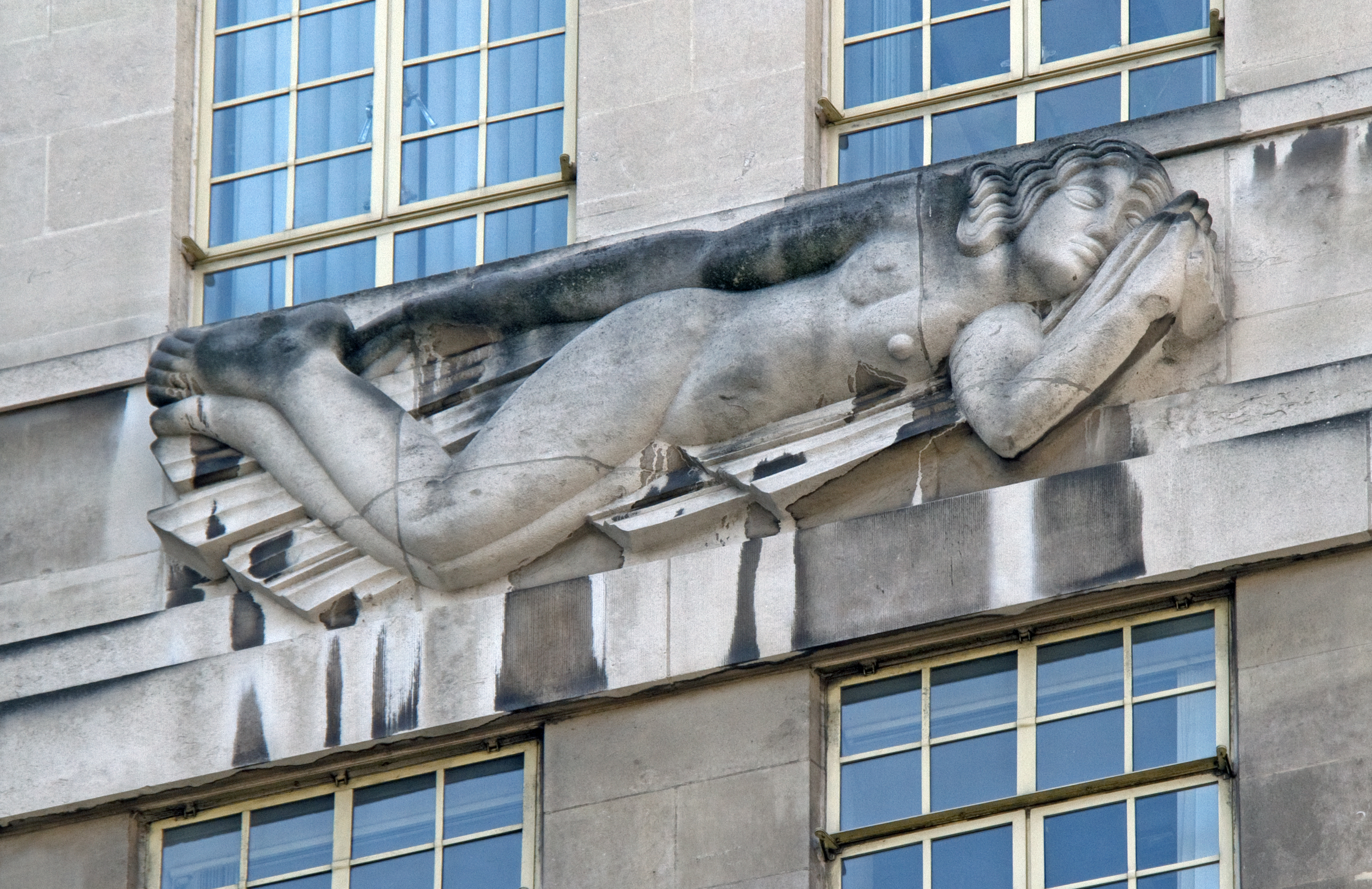
South Wind by Eric Gill

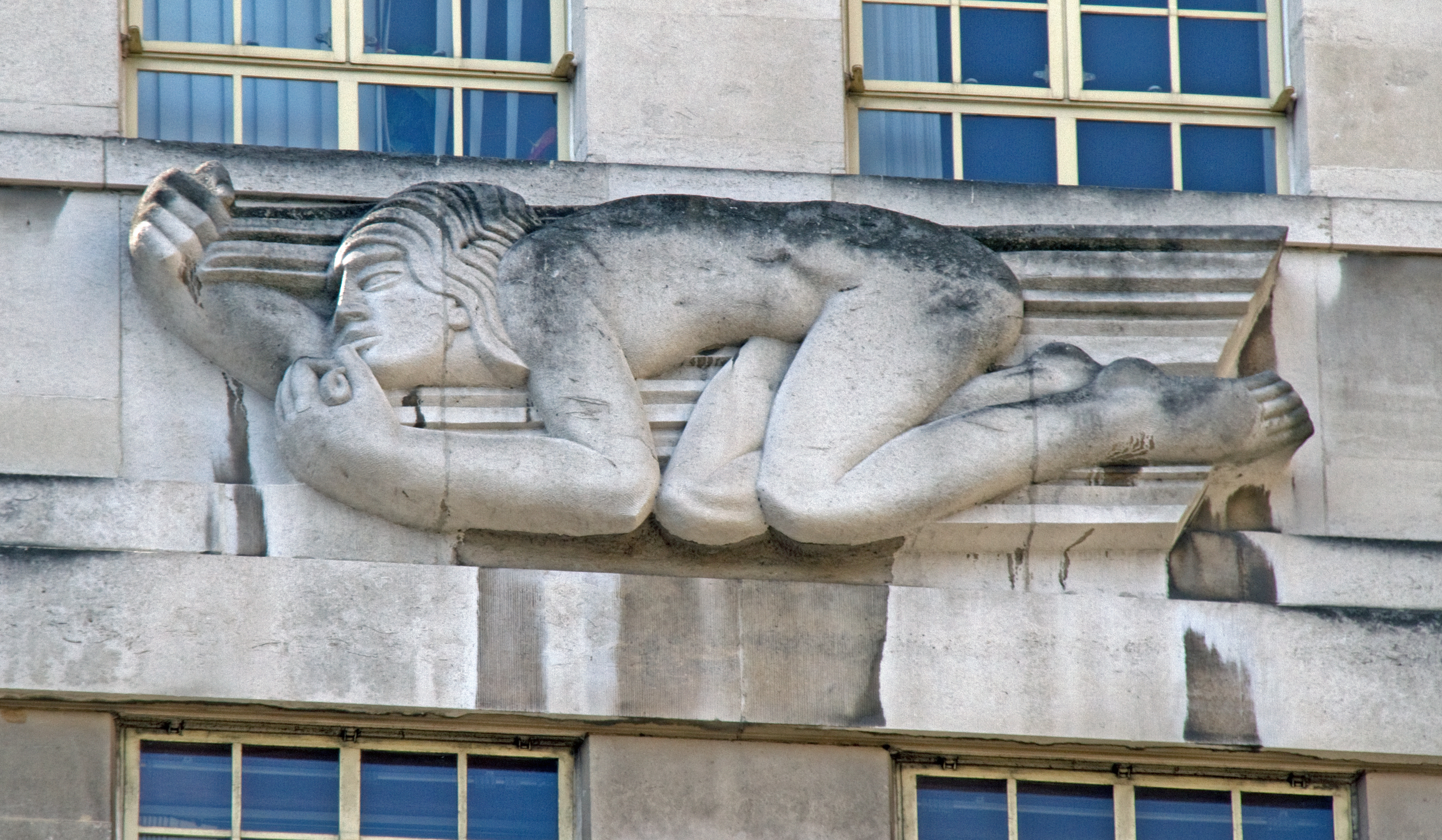
North Wind by Eric Gill

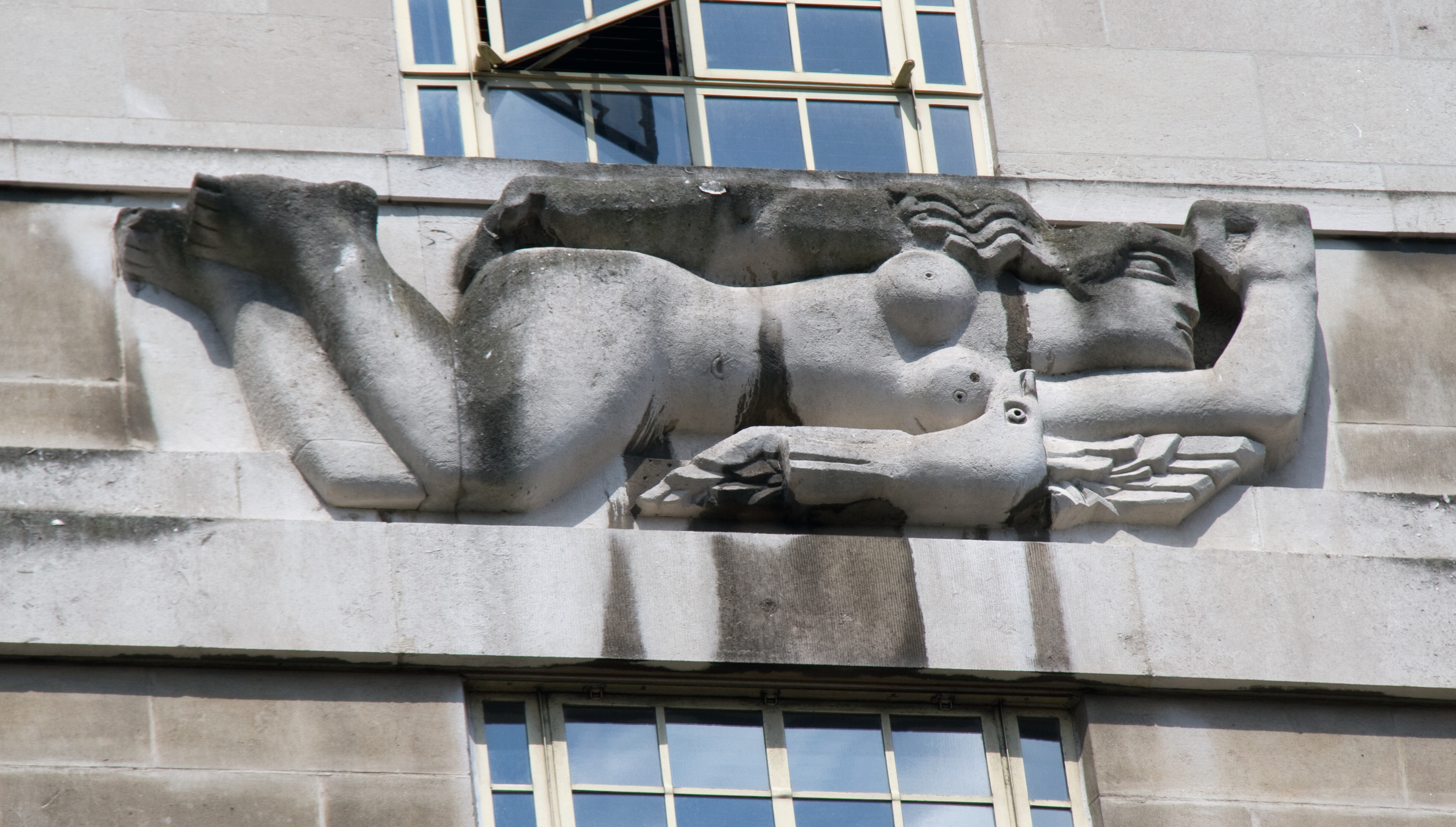
West Wind by Samuel Rabinovitch

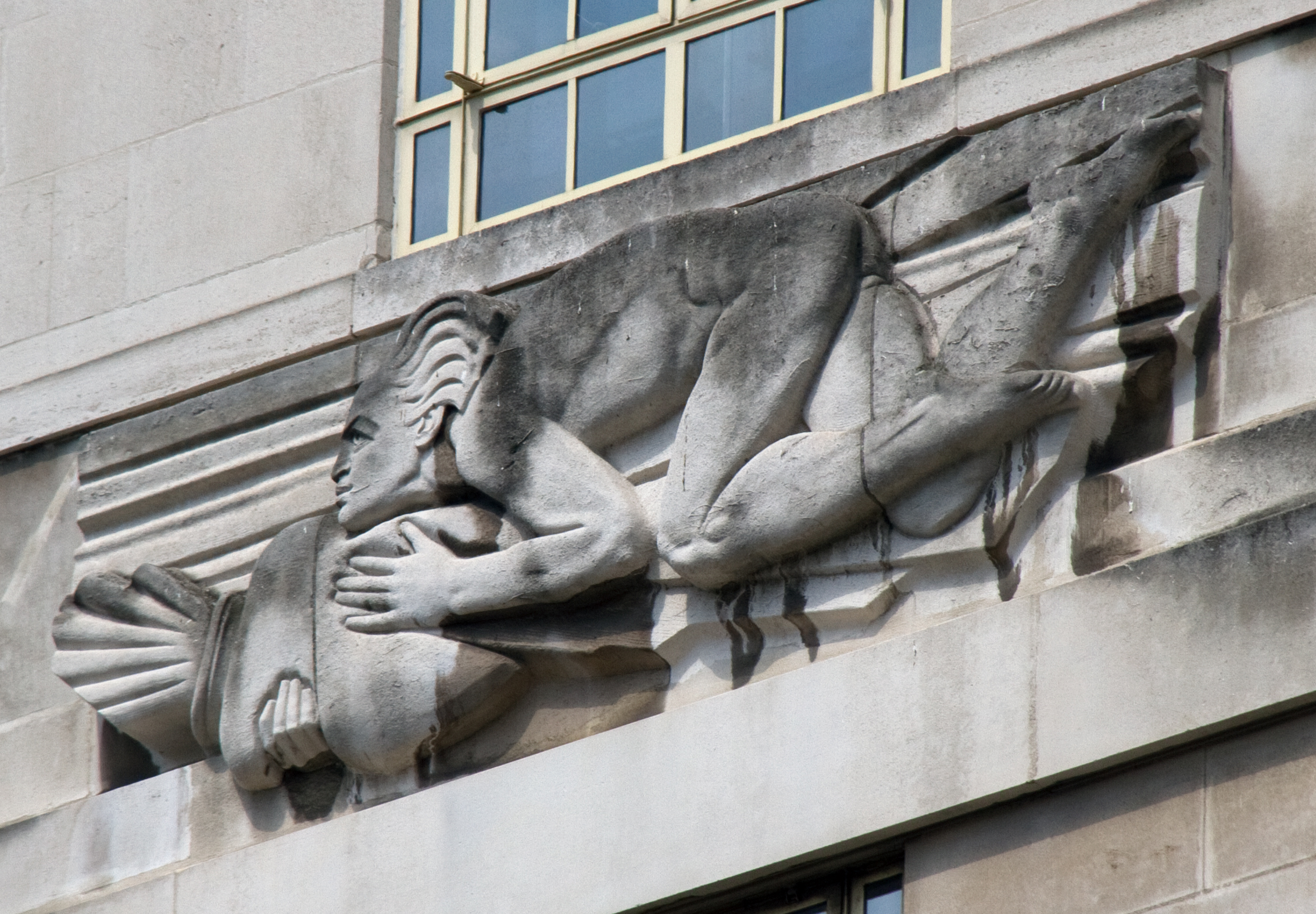
East Wind by Allan G. Wyon

== Bibliography ==
- Modern Architectural Sculpture, Ed. William Aumonier, The Architectural Press, London 1930
- Karol, Eitan (2007). Charles Holden: Architect. Shaun Tyas. ISBN 978-1-900289-81-8.
