= Kaff Gerrard =

British artist (1894-1970)

- Born: 1894
- Died: 1970 (aged 75–76)
- Education: Slade School of Art
- Known for: Painting and pottery
- Spouse: Alfred Gerrard

Kaff Gerrard née Katherine Leigh-Pemberton (1894–1970) was a British artist. Although she was a prolific painter and potter, Gerrard rarely exhibited during her lifetime and only gained significant recognition after her death. A 1991 exhibition led to a number of British national museums acquiring examples of her work.

== Biography ==
Gerrard studied at the Slade School of Art from 1922 to 1924 and won several prizes while there. These included the first prize for painting from the cast in 1922, a prize for life painting and, in 1923, a first prize for portrait painting. While at the Slade, she met her future husband Alfred Gerrard who later became head of the Slade sculpture department and then professor of sculpture at the college. The couple married in 1933 and lived in an old farmhouse in Kent. While her husband developed his teaching career and completed several public commissions, Gerrard continued to paint, work on pottery and sculpture and develop a country garden. She painted on either the Sussex Downs or the South Downs on an almost daily basis. During World War II, Gerrard painted a number of rural scenes showing crashed planes and bomb damage. At least one of these was purchased by the War Artists' Advisory Committee. Gerrard also painted more abstract works often with a heavily symbolic content, sometimes with Christian elements. During her life, Gerrard only had one public exhibition of her work, a joint show with her future husband at the Colnaghi gallery in 1931, that featured examples of her pottery and sculpture. In 1991, an exhibition of her work was held at the Royal Museum & Art Gallery in Canterbury. This led to a reappraisal of her work and a number of British museums and galleries acquired examples of her art. These included the Tate, the Imperial War Museum and the Fitzwilliam Museum in Cambridge.
