= Forceville =

- Commune
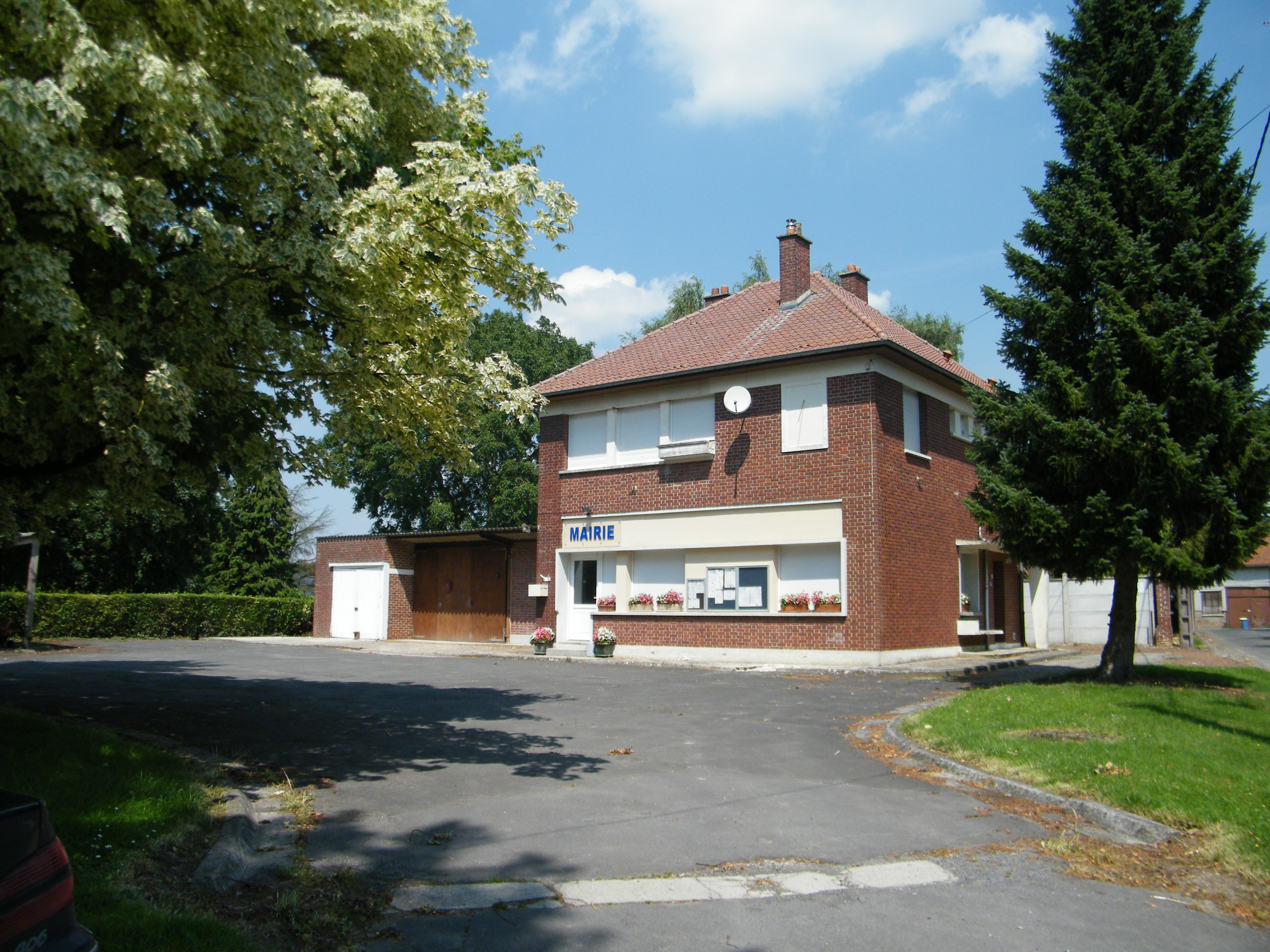
- The town hall in Forceville

- Coat of arms
- Location of Forceville
- Location within France Location within Hauts-de-France
- Coordinates: 50°03′44″N 2°33′27″E
- Country: France
- Region: Hauts-de-France
- Department: Somme
- Arrondissement: Péronne
- Canton: Albert
- Intercommunality: Pays du Coquelicot

Government
  - Mayor (2020–2026): Claude Sauvage
- Area^{1}: 7.57 km^{2} (2.92 sq mi)
- Elevation: 108 m (354 ft)
- Highest elevation: 150 m (490 ft)
- Lowest elevation: 100 m (330 ft)
- Population (2023): 163
  - Density: 21.5/km^{2} (55.8/sq mi)
- Time zone: UTC+01:00 (CET)
  - Summer (DST): UTC+02:00 (CEST)
- INSEE/Postal code: 80329 /80560
- ^{1} French Land Register data, which excludes lakes, ponds, glaciers > 1 km^{2} (0.386 sq mi or 247 acres) and river estuaries.

Forceville (French pronunciation: [fɔʁsəvil]; Picard: Fourville-in-Anmiénoé) is a commune in the Somme department in Hauts-de-France in northern France.

== Geography ==
Situated on the D938 road, some 20 miles (32 km) north-east of Amiens. On 18 December 1915 the 107th Company, Machine Gun Corps, was established here as part of the 36th (Ulster) Division.

== Population ==
Historical population
Year	Pop.	±% p.a.
1968	203	—
1975	199	−0.28%
1982	181	−1.35%
1990	182	+0.07%
1999	161	−1.35%
2007	167	+0.46%
2012	174	+0.82%
2017	175	+0.11%
2023	163	−1.18%
Source: INSEE

== Places of interest ==
- The old railway line

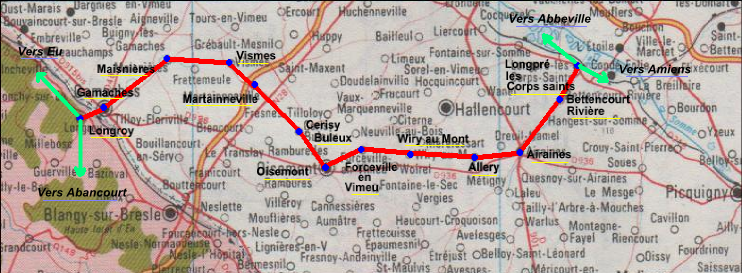
Map of the old railway

== See also ==
- Communes of the Somme department
