= Eric Aumonier =

British sculptor

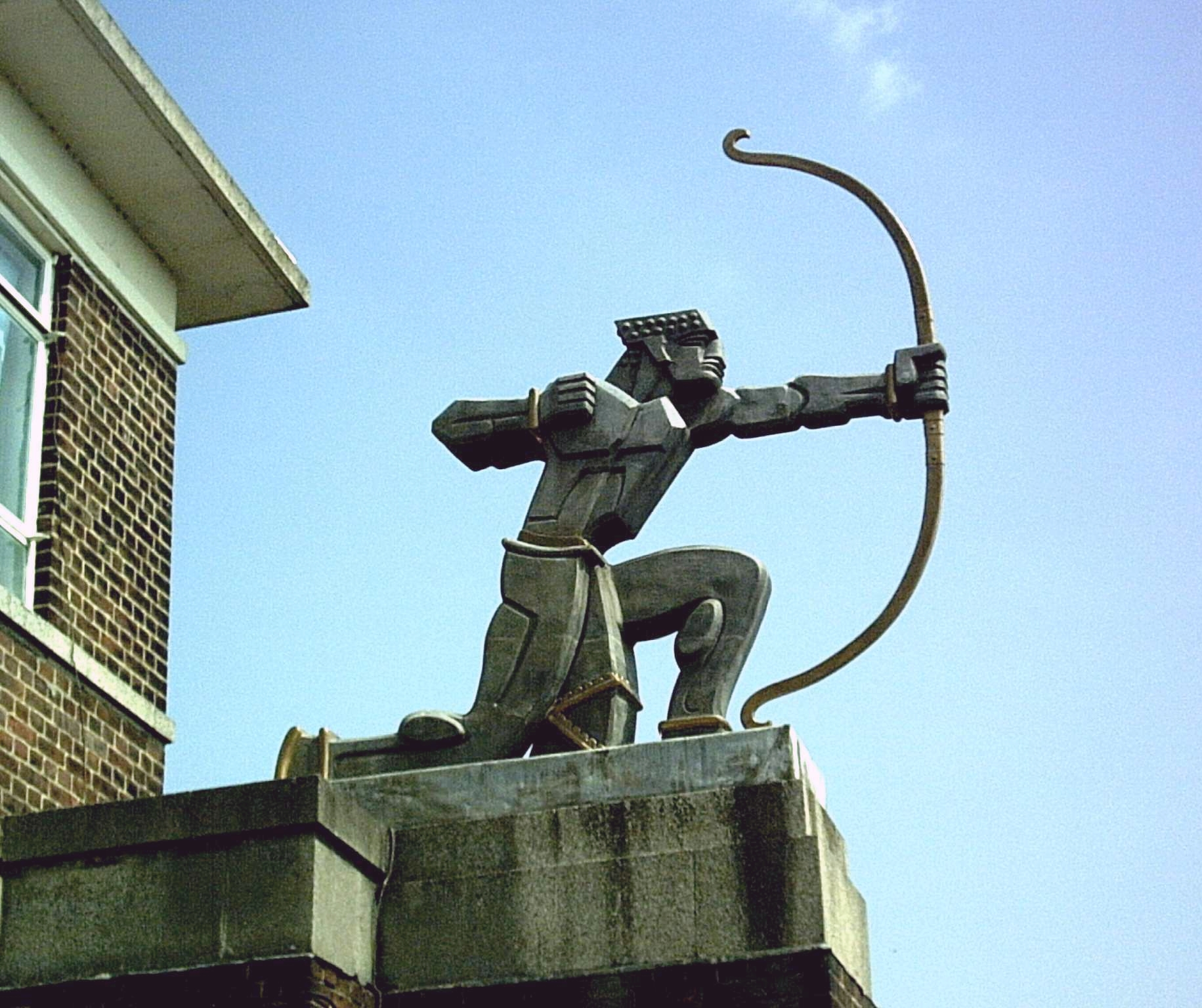
- "The Archer" at East Finchley Underground station
- Born: Aubrey Eric Stacy Aumonier; 5 May 1899; Northwood, Middlesex, England
- Died: 1974 (aged 74–75); Ashburton, New Zealand
- Education: Slade School of Art
- Known for: Sculpture
- Notable work: "The Archer"
- Patrons: London Underground

Aubrey Eric Stacy Aumonier (5 May 1899 – 1974), was a British sculptor.

== Life ==
Aumonier was born in Northwood, Middlesex (now northwest London); his family name is Huguenot (French Protestant). Eric's grandfather, William, initiated the Aumonier Studios in 1876, an architectural sculpture business in London, initially located at New Inn Yard off Tottenham Court Road, then at 84 Charlotte Street. William's son, also named William, continued the business into the 1930s. William (junior) studied at the West London School of Art. He exhibited at the Royal Academy of Art in 1899–1900 and was responsible for the architectural decorations of the Victoria Law Courts, Birmingham, during the late 1880s.

Two of William's sons, Whitworth and Eric himself, were sculptors. Eric studied at the Slade School of Art. By 1931, Eric and Whitworth were managing the studio as W. Aumonier & Sons, with Eric responsible for artistic output.

In 1929, Aumonier was commissioned with five others to carve one of a set of relief sculptures of the four winds for 55 Broadway, the new Underground Electric Railways Company of London headquarters in St. James's, London, designed by Charles Holden. Aumonier carved the South Wind on the west side of the North wing (not visible from ground level).

In 1932, Aumonier designed two Art Deco relief sculptures in the foyer of the Daily Express Building in London. He also designed a statue of a young horse, in white porcelain, for Royal Worcester.

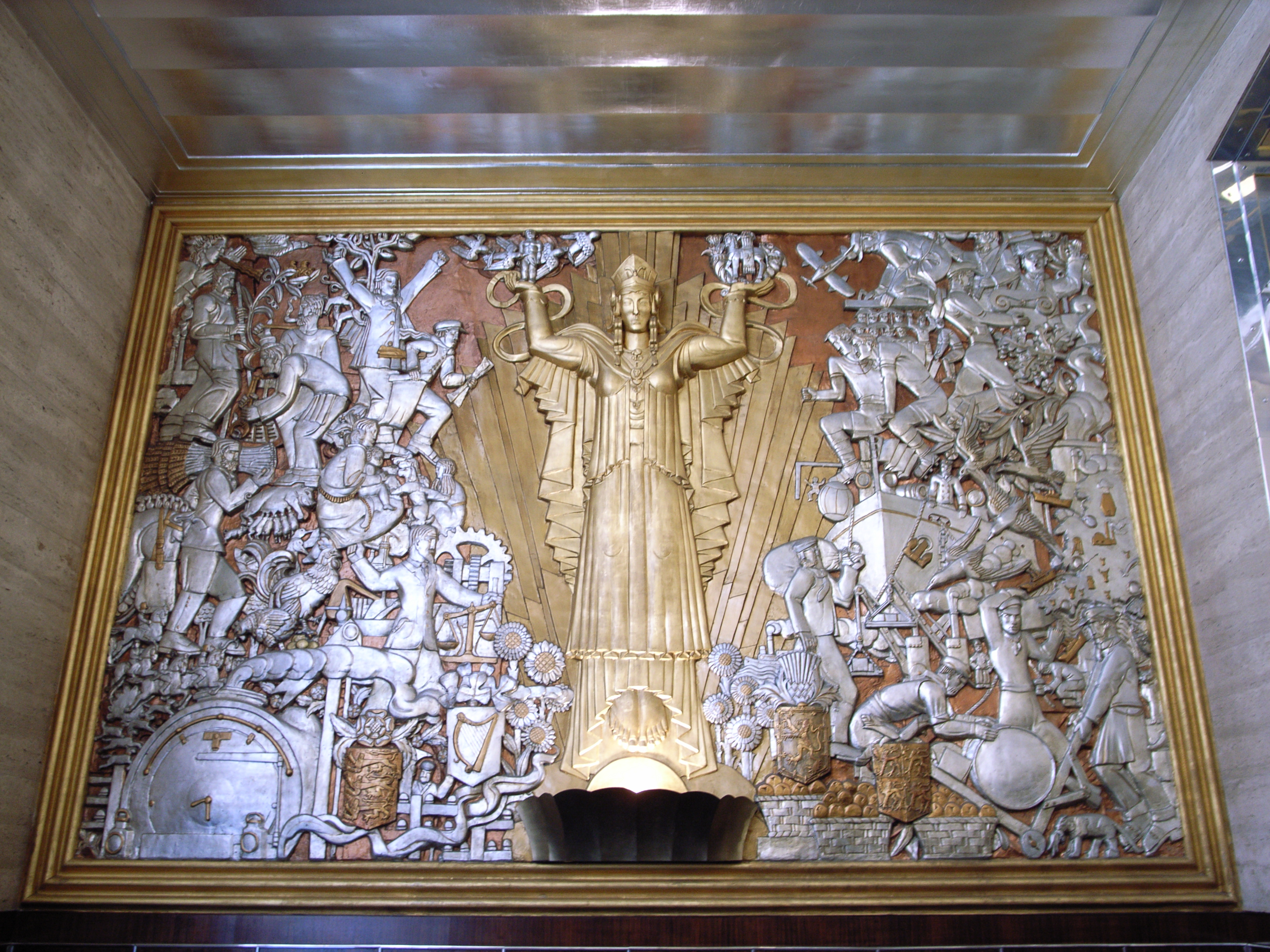
"Britain" Panel from the Daily Express building foyer.

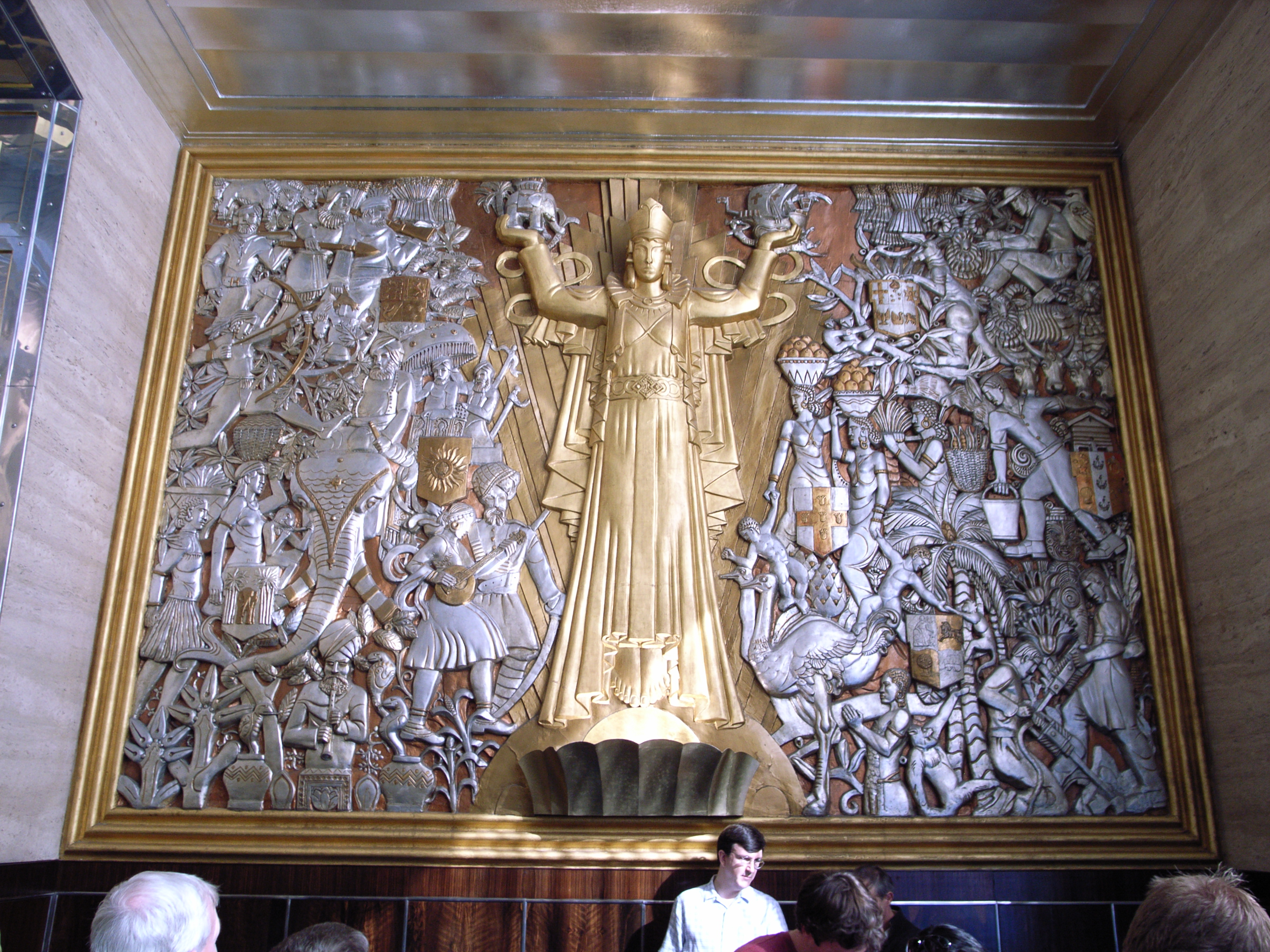
"Empire" Panel from the Daily Express building foyer.

Another commission for London Underground, the statue The Archer at East Finchley Underground station, is his best known work, the only three-dimensional statue in the system. The contract for the work was made on 8 June 1939, with an estimated cost of £245. The architect for the station was once again Charles Holden. The sculpture was unveiled on 22 July 1940.

Pennyfare, London Transport's staff journal, explained the image in July 1940:

"the figure of an ancient hunter of wild game is placed high up on the new East Finchley station. It is more than a decorative device – it is powerful symbolism".

Finchley was on the edge of the royal forest of Enfield, which was hunted by both court and commoner. Drivers on the Northern line still bear a tie pin based on the sculpture.

The Archer is nearly twice natural size and was made of six hundredweight of beech timber round a steel armature and then covered with 5 hundredweight of sheet lead. The timber had come from Czechoslovakia. The gold for the gilded features was mined in South Africa and the bow was English ash, bent by steam and coated with copper and gilt. The sculpture was probably constructed in three main sections, which were re-assembled on site.

Amongst other work for London Underground, Aumonier also made two stone reliefs over two of the entrances to the canteen at London Underground's Acton Works – one of a pie, knife and fork. A sculpture of Dick Whittington was planned for Highgate tube station, but a reduction of the scope of the new station buildings caused by World War II meant this was never commissioned.

Aumonier worked on the new City Hall in Norwich with Alfred Hardiman and James Woodford.

The sculptor also did some set work in the cinema. In 1946 he worked on the Powell and Pressburger movie A Matter of Life and Death at Denham Film Studios. On the giant moving stairway featured in the movie, Aumonier created the statues of various famous people. By coincidence, Powell and Pressburger's production company was named The Archers.

During later years, Aumonier and his wife relocated to Ashburton, New Zealand, where he died in 1974.
