= List of works by Charles Holden =

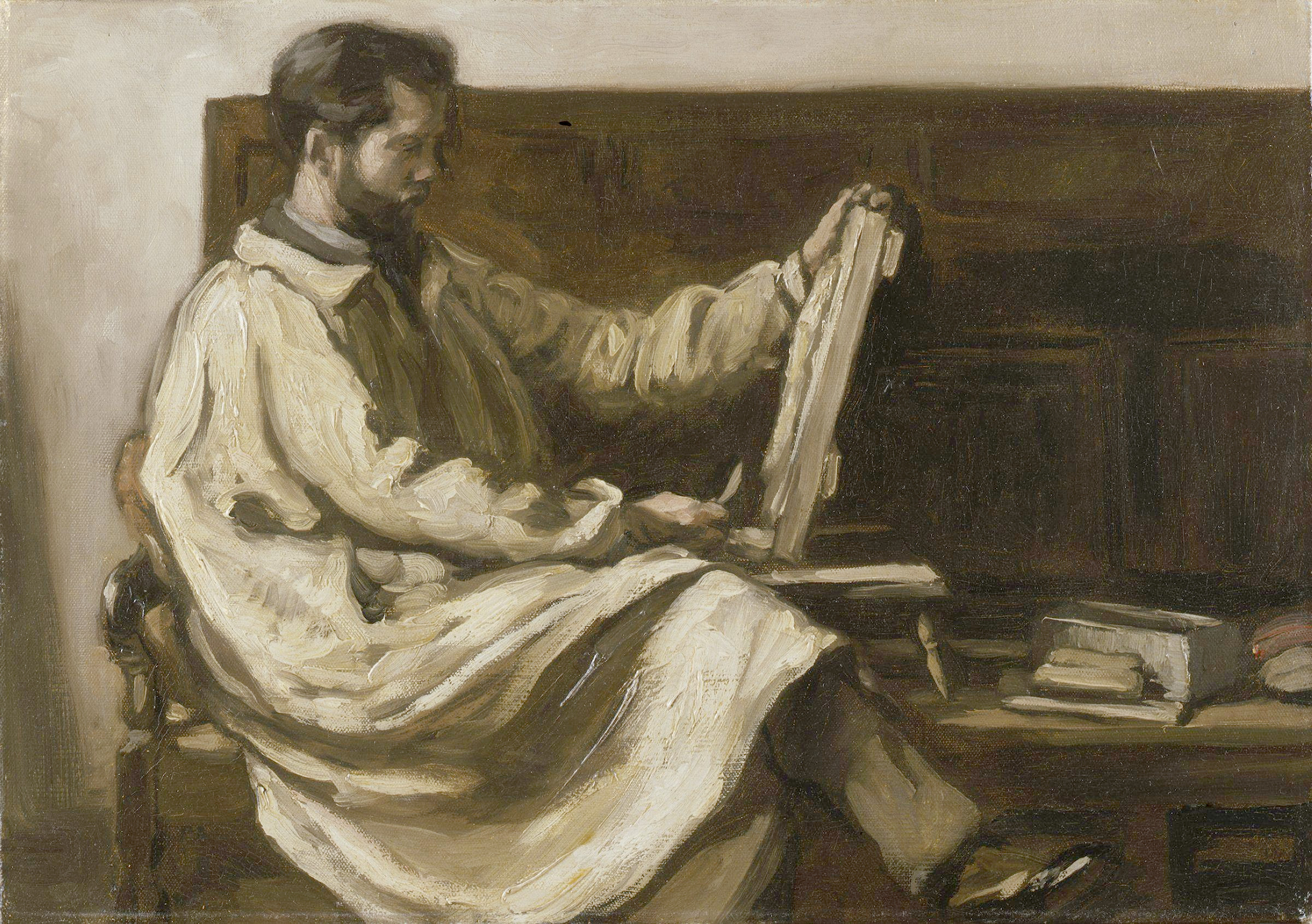
Charles Holden by Benjamin Nelson, 1910

Charles Holden (12 May 1875 – 1 May 1960) was an English architect best known for designing many London Underground stations during the 1920s and 1930s. Other notable designs were Bristol Central Library, the Underground Electric Railways Company of London's headquarters at 55 Broadway and the University of London's Senate House. Many of his buildings have been granted listed building status, indicating that they are considered to be of architectural or historical interest and protecting them from unapproved alteration. (Note: Listed buildings are granted one of three grades (II, II* and I in order of importance) representing their status as nationally or internationally important buildings. In England, the register of listed building is administered by Historic England. A listed building may not be demolished, extended or altered without special permission from the local planning authority.) He also designed over 60 war cemeteries and two memorials in Belgium and northern France for the Imperial War Graves Commission from 1920 to 1928.

Holden's early architectural training was in Bolton and Manchester where he worked for architects Everard W. Leeson and Jonathan Simpson before moving to London. After a short period with Arts and Crafts designer Charles Robert Ashbee, he went to work for Henry Percy Adams in 1899. He became Adams' partner in the firm in 1907 and remained with it for the rest of his career.

== Buildings ==
Holden's early buildings were influenced by the Arts and Crafts movement, but for most of his career he championed an unadorned style based on simplified forms and massing that was free of what he considered to be unnecessary decorative detailing. He believed strongly that architectural designs should be dictated by the intended functions of buildings. After the First World War he increasingly simplified his style and his designs became pared-down and modernist, influenced by continental European architecture. This list includes all buildings for which Holden was commissioned to produce designs.

Building	Location (Note: These buildings are located in London unless otherwise indicated.)	Year completed	Listed	Note
14–15 Old Bond Street	Westminster	1911	–	
55 Broadway	Westminster	1929	Grade I	First cruciform plan office building in Britain; includes St James's Park tube station. Sculptures commissioned by Holden for the building include Jacob Epstein's Day and Night and Henry Moore's first public commission.
87 Harmer Green Lane	Welwyn, Hertfordshire	1906	–	Holden's own home
127 & 129 High Holborn	Holborn	1904	Grade II	
Acton Town Underground station	Acton	1932	Grade II	
Almshouses	Woburn, Bedfordshire	1906	–	
Alperton Underground station	Alperton	1931	–	
Archway Underground station	Archway	1931	–	Replacement Portland stone and glazed screen entrance façade, since demolished
Arnos Grove Underground station	Arnos Grove	1932	Grade II*	
Balham Underground station	Balham	1926	Grade II	
Bedfordshire Cottages, Workhouse site	Woburn, Bedfordshire	1901	–	
Belgrave Hospital for Children	Kennington	1903	Grade II*	
Birchmoor Lodge	Woburn, Bedfordshire	1901	–	
Bond Street Underground station	West End	1927	–	Replacement Portland stone and glazed screen entrance façade, since demolished
Boston Manor Underground station	Boston Manor	1934	Grade II	With Stanley Heaps
Bounds Green Underground station	Bounds Green	1932	Grade II	With Charles Holloway James
Bristol Central Library	Bristol	1906	Grade I	A Tudor revival exterior with classical interior. Furnishings also by Holden.
Bristol Royal Infirmary King Edward VII memorial extension	Bristol	1912	–	
British Medical Association	Strand	1908	Grade II*	Now Zimbabwe House. Jacob Epstein's series of sculptures caused great controversy when unveiled. They were defaced in the 1930s to prevent pieces falling off.
British Seamen's Hospital	Istanbul, Turkey	1903	–	
Bushey Heath Underground station	Bushey, Hertfordshire	–	–	Unbuilt
Cavendish Laboratory, Austin Wing, University of Cambridge	Cambridge, Cambridgeshire	1940	–	
Chiswick Park Underground station	Chiswick	1932	Grade II	
Clapham Common Underground station	Clapham	1924	Grade II	
Clapham South Underground station	Clapham	1926	Grade II	
Clifton College Memorial Arch	Bristol	1922	Grade II	
Colliers Wood Underground station	Colliers Wood	1926	Grade II	
Cockfosters Underground station	Cockfosters	1933	Grade II	
Cottages	Port Sunlight, Merseyside	1898	–	
Cottage Hospital	Woburn, Bedfordshire	1903	Grade II	Listed as Henry P. Adams design
Crowholt Lodge	Woburn, Bedfordshire	1914	–	
Danvers Tower, Cheyne Walk	Chelsea	–	–	Unbuilt design for artists' studios
Ealing Common Underground station	Ealing	1931	Grade II	With Stanley Heaps
Eastcote Underground station	Eastcote	1939	Grade II	
East Finchley Underground station	East Finchley	1939	Grade II	With Leonard Holcombe Bucknell
Elstree South Underground station	Elstree, Hertfordshire	–	–	Unbuilt
Evelyn House, Oxford Street	West End	1909	Grade II	
Farm Cottages	Mayland, Essex	1906	–	
Finchley Central Underground station	Finchley	–	–	With Reginald Uren. Unbuilt.
Gants Hill Underground station	Gants Hill	1947	–	The platform level concourse was modelled after stations on the Moscow Metro
General Hospital	Tunbridge Wells, Kent	1902	–	
Green Park Underground station	Piccadilly	1932	–	New Portland stone entrance shelter adjacent to Green Park, since demolished
Grey Gables	Bolton, Greater Manchester	1898	–	
Hall of Remembrance (War Museum)	London	–	–	Unbuilt
Hammersmith tube station	Hammersmith	1931	–	New Portland stone and glazed screen secondary entrance façade, since demolished
Haresfoot	Berkhamsted, Buckinghamshire	1920	–	Additions to existing house
Highgate Underground station	Highgate	1939	–	Partly built and partly disused
Holborn Underground station	Holborn	1933	–	Replacement Portland stone and glazed screen entrance façade
Homeopathic Cottage Hospital	Southport, Lancashire	1909	–	Arts and Crafts hospital building with sea view.
Hounslow West Underground station	Hounslow	1931	Grade II	With Stanley Heaps
House	Delamere Forest, Cheshire	1898	–	Holden's first project, unknown location
House	Holford, Somerset	1923	–	
House Knight	Bepton Common, Midhurst, West Sussex	1915	–	
House Mayor	Bicknoller, Somerset	1928	–	
House Semon	Great Missenden, Buckinghamshire	1910	Grade II	Now known as Rignalls
House Sixsmith	Adlington, Lancashire	1907	Grade II	Now known as Brown Low
Institution of Electrical Engineers Interiors, Savoy Place	Westminster	1911	–	
Isle of Thanet District Hospital	Margate, Kent	1926	Grade II	Now part of Queen Elizabeth, the Queen Mother Hospital
Isolation Hospital for Infectious Diseases	Ampthill, Bedfordshire	1903	–	
King Edward VII Sanatorium	Easebourne parish, near Midhurst, West Sussex	1906	Grade II*	Chapel separately listed Grade II*
Lodge	Woburn, Bedfordshire	1908	–	
Lodge, Birchmoor Drive	Woburn, Bedfordshire	1914	–	
Kings College for Women	Kensington	1916	Grade II	Wren-influenced design for college for domestic science
Sir James Knott Memorial Flats	Tynemouth	1939	–	With Tasker & Child
Law Society extension	Holborn	1904	Grade II*	Listed with main building by Lewis Vulliamy
Leicester Square Underground station	West End	1933	–	New Portland stone entrance building including public house and sub-surface booking hall and concourse
London Underground Acton Works and Offices	Acton	1932	–	
Manor House Underground station	Manor House	1932	–	
Mansion House Underground station	City of London	1930	–	Replacement Portland stone and glazed screen entrance façade, since demolished
Memorial Chapel, New College, Oxford	Oxford, Oxfordshire	–	–	Unbuilt
Morden Underground station	Morden	1926	–	
Mortuary Chapel, Richmond Hospital	Richmond	1914	–	
National Library of Wales	Aberystwyth, Wales	1937	Grade II*	Front range (modified version of earlier design by Sidney Greenslade). Also the Central Hall (completed 1955).
Northfields Underground station	Northfields	1932	Grade II	
Oakwood Underground station	Oakwood	1932	Grade II*	With Charles Holloway James. The free-standing station sign is separately listed Grade II
Orchestral Association	London	1912	–	
Osterley Underground station	Osterley	1934	Grade II	With Stanley Heaps
Piccadilly Circus Underground station	Piccadilly	1928	Grade II	Sub-surface booking hall and concourse beneath the roadway of Piccadilly Circus
Rayners Lane Underground station	Harrow	1938	Grade II	With Reginald Uren
Redbridge Underground station	Redbridge	1947	Grade II	
Royal Northern Hospital	Holloway	1941	–	Demolished
Royal Victoria Infirmary	Newcastle upon Tyne, Tyne and Wear	1906	–	With W. L. Newcombe
Royal Westminster Ophthalmic Hospital	Westminster	1926	–	
St George's Hospital, Hyde Park Corner	Westminster	–	–	Unbuilt
St Luke's Hospital	Valletta, Malta	1939	–	
School of Oriental and African Studies, University of London	Bloomsbury	1946	Grade II	
Senate House, University of London	Bloomsbury	1937	Grade II*	Tallest office building in London from 1937 to 1957. Remnant of a much grander unrealised scheme.
Shire Hall extension	Bedford, Bedfordshire	1910	Grade II	Listed with main building by Alfred Waterhouse
Southgate Underground station	Southgate	1932	Grade II*	Station parade and lamp standards also by Holden separately listed Grade II and Grade II*
South Harrow Underground station	South Harrow	1935	–	
South Wimbledon Underground station	South Wimbledon	1926	Grade II	
SS Caldedonia, Interiors	–	1922	–	Interior design of principal rooms for Anchor Line ocean liner
SS Cameronia, Interiors	–	1922	–	Interior design of principal rooms for Anchor Line ocean liner
SS Tuscania, Interiors	–	1922	–	Interior design of principal rooms for Anchor Line ocean liner
Sudbury Hill Underground station	Sudbury	1931	Grade II	
Sudbury Town Underground station	Sudbury	1931	Grade II*	
Sutton Valence School	Sutton Valence, Kent	1914	Grade II	
Sutton Valence School, Chapel	Sutton Valence, Kent	1928	–	
Tomb of Oscar Wilde, Père Lachaise Cemetery	Paris, France	1912	–	With Jacob Epstein
Tooting Bec Underground station	Tooting	1926	Grade II	
Tooting Broadway Underground station	Tooting	1926	Grade II	
Torbay Hospital	Torbay, Devon	1927	–	
Torbay Hospital Chapel	Torbay, Devon	1929	Grade II	
Trent Park House	Enfield	1926	Grade II	New façades to existing mansion
Turnpike Lane Underground station	Harringay	1932	Grade II	
Two Cottages	Oakley, Bedfordshire	1905	–	
Two Cottages	Woburn, Bedfordshire	1907	–	
Uxbridge Underground station	Uxbridge	1938	Grade II	With Leonard Holcombe Bucknell
Victoria Hospital	Folkestone, Kent	1910	–	Ward extensions
Wanstead Underground station	Wanstead	1947	–	
Warren Street Underground station	Euston	1933	–	Replacement station building
West Ham Hospital	West Ham	1907	–	
West Kensington Underground station	West Kensington	1928	–	New façade and ticket hall
Westminster Female Refuge	Westminster	1902	–	
Westminster Hospital, Clapham Common	Clapham	–	–	Unbuilt
Westminster Underground station	Westminster	1924	–	Replacement side entrance and ticket hall, since demolished
Women's Hospital, Soho Square	Soho	1908	Grade II	New façades and internal redesign of two existing houses
Woodcote	Aspley Guise, Bedfordshire	1914	–	
Wood Green Underground station	Wood Green	1932	Grade II	

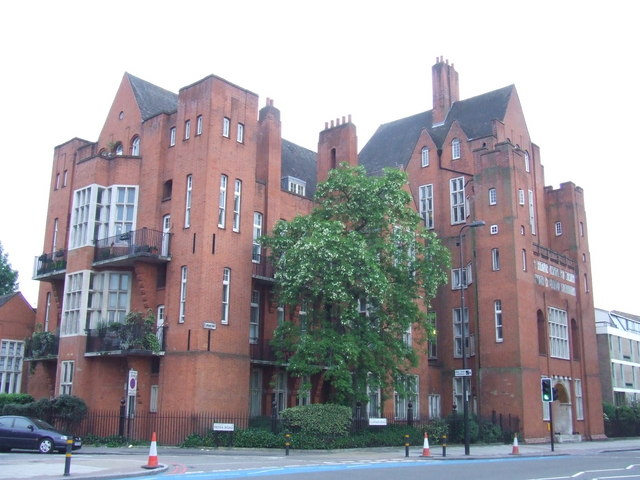
The Arts and Crafts design for the Belgrave Hospital for Children, Kennington, was inspired by Philip Webb and Henry Wilson.

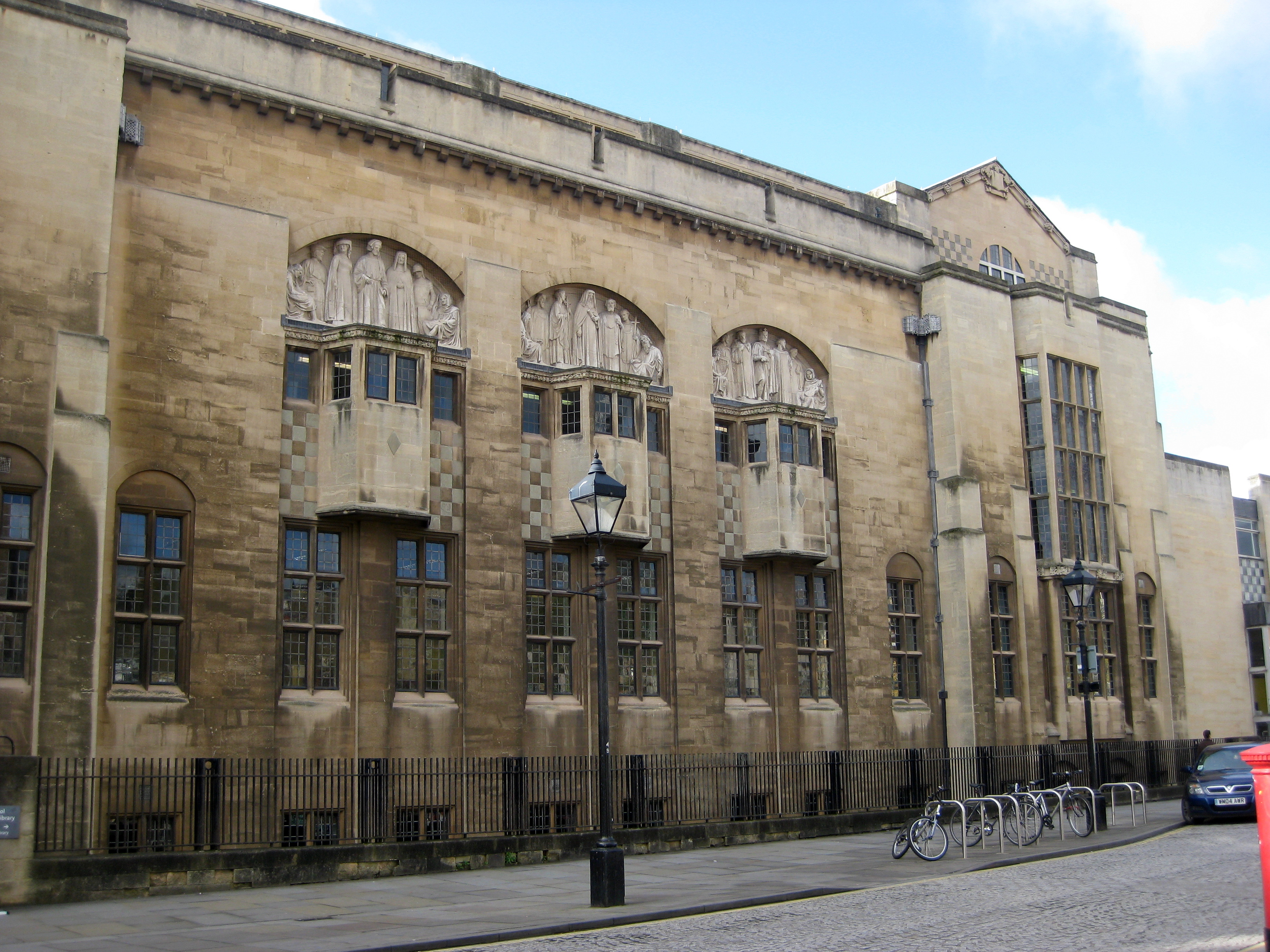
Holden's competition-winning Tudor Revival design for Bristol Central Library was described by Andor Gomme as "one of the great masterpieces of the early Modern Movement".

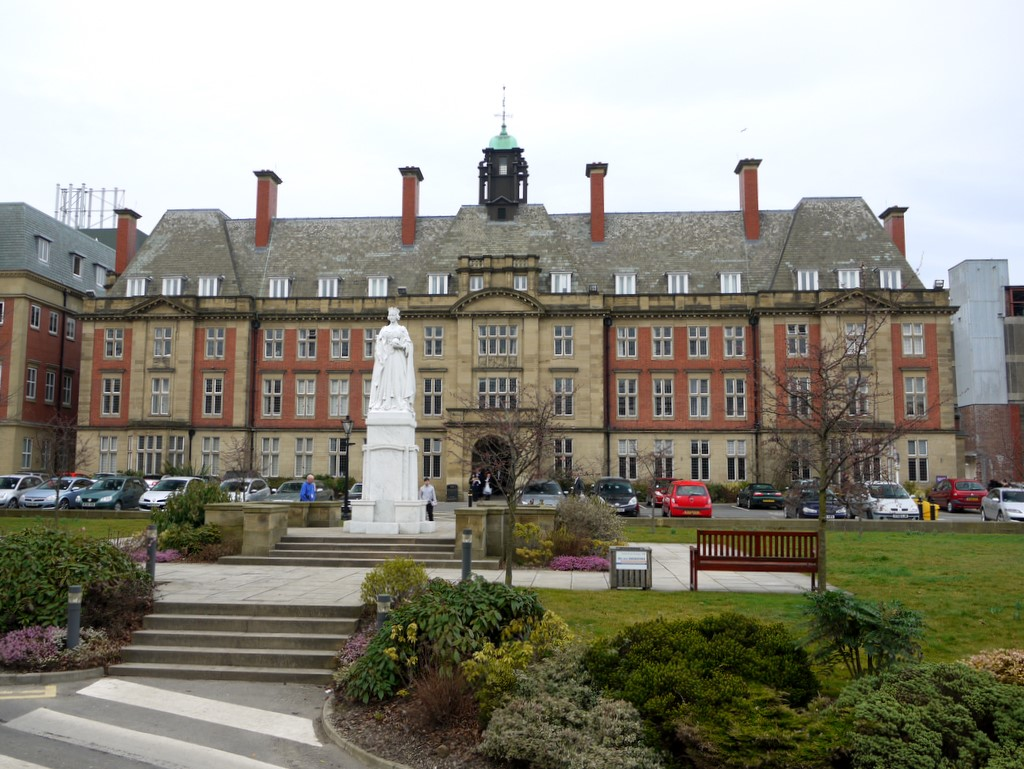
A typical Edwardian façade for the Royal Victoria Infirmary, Newcastle upon Tyne, carried out with W. L. Newcombe.

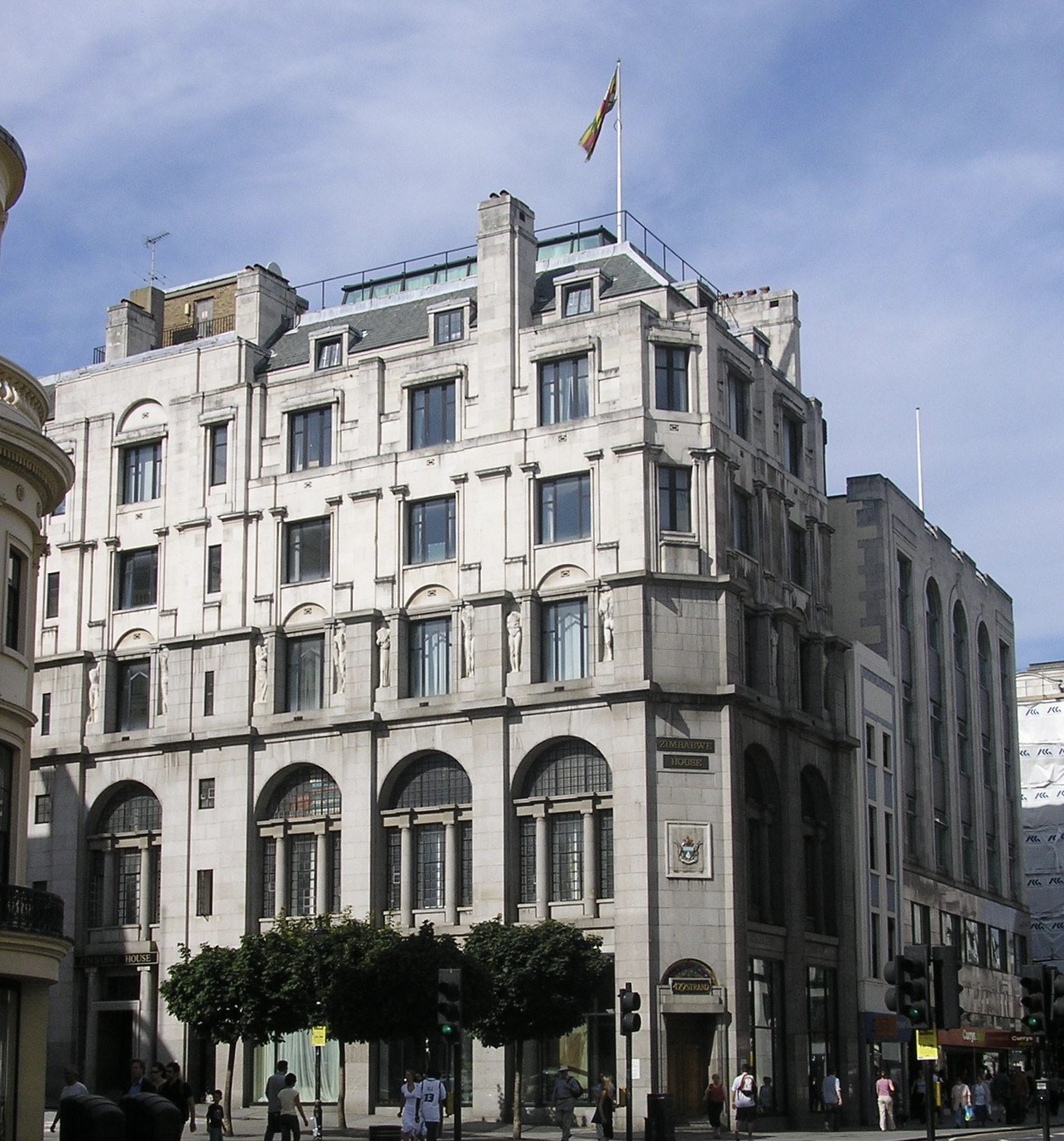
The series of sculptures commissioned from Jacob Epstein for the British Medical Association Building, Strand, Westminster were highly controversial and calls were made in the newspapers to have them removed.

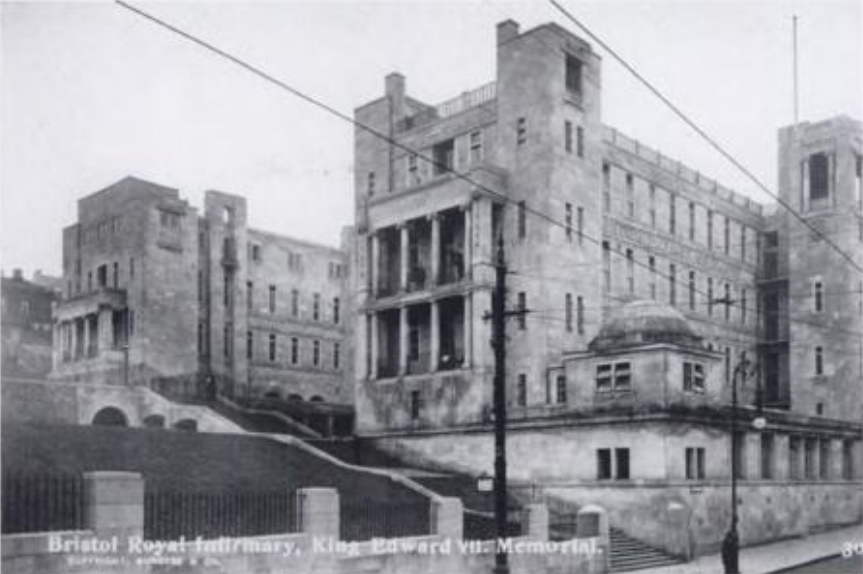
For the Bristol Royal Infirmary, King Edward VII Memorial wing, Holden designed simplified abstract façades of white Portland stone.

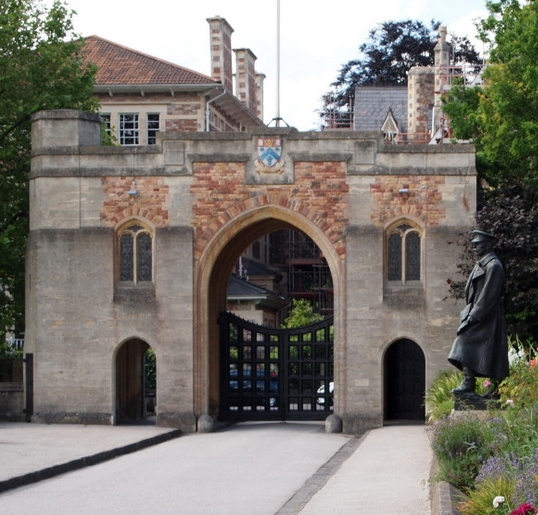
Clifton College Memorial Arch, Bristol was constructed in a Gothic style using limestone and gritstone to match the college buildings.

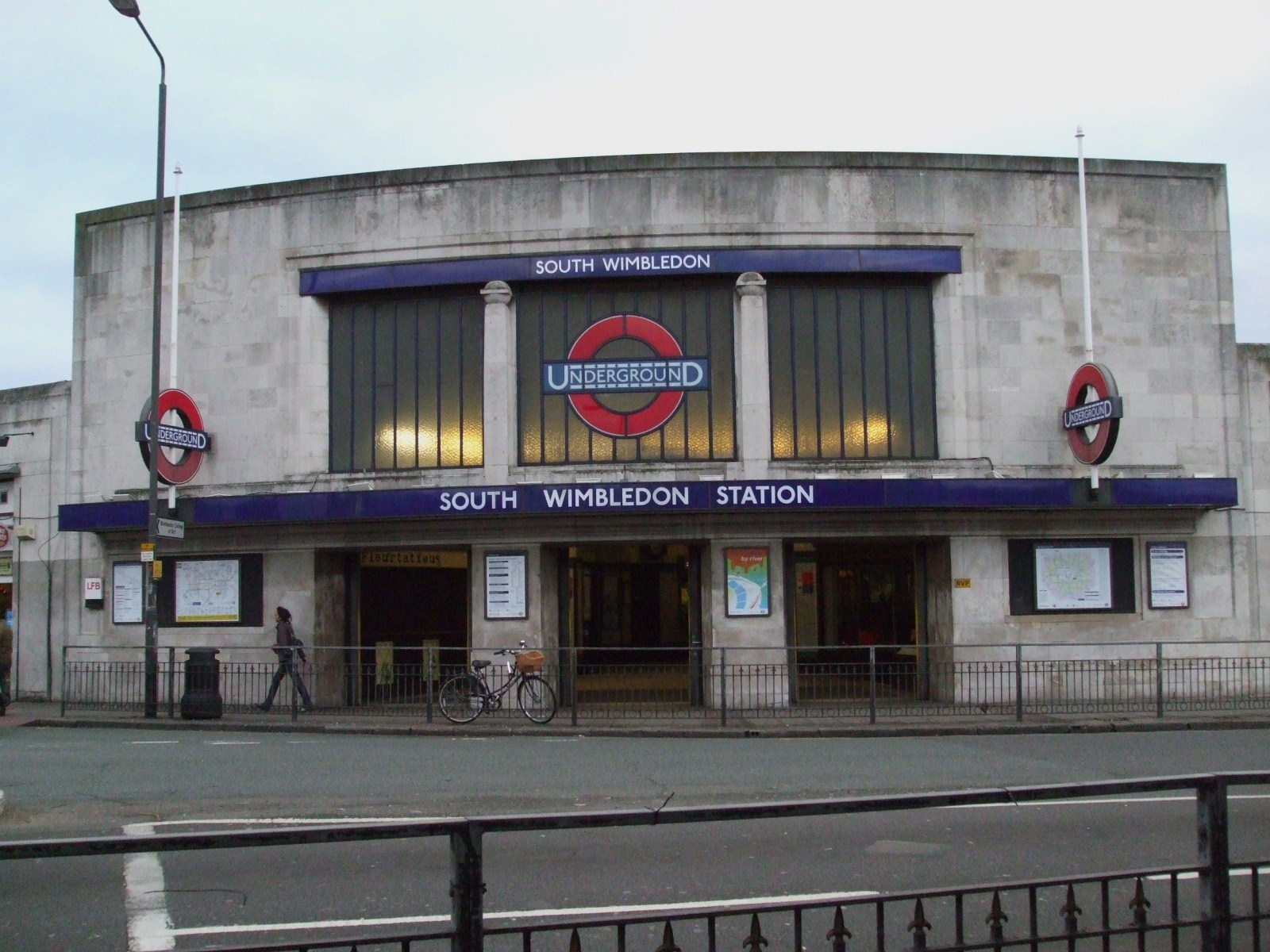
South Wimbledon station, Merton, demonstrates the modernist glazed "folded screen" design that Holden developed for the seven new stations of the City and South London Railway's extension to Morden.

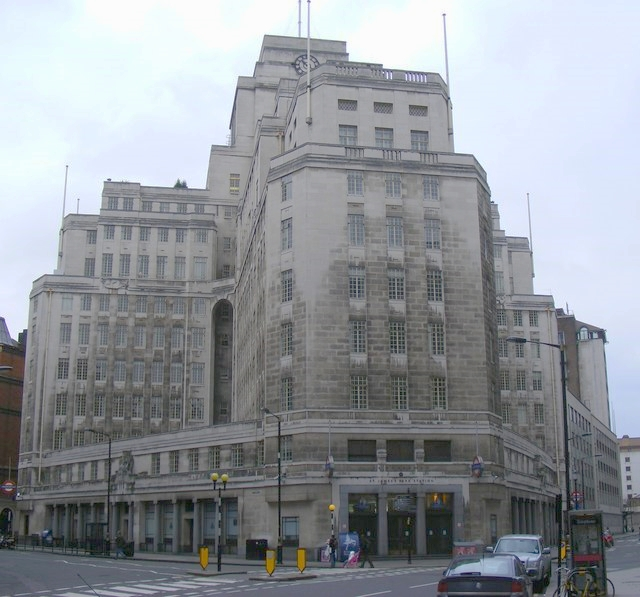
The cruciform plan of the Underground Group's headquarters at 55 Broadway, Westminster, maximised the daylight entering the building without using light wells. It was the first British office building to be planned in this way.

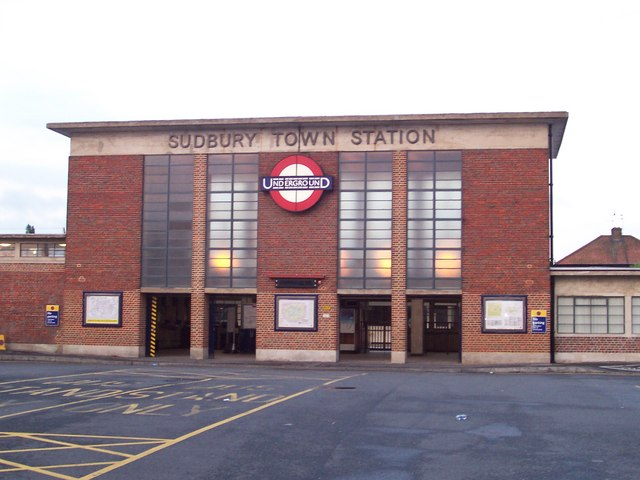
European architecture inspired a new style for the Piccadilly line described by Holden as "brick boxes with concrete lids". Sudbury Town station, Sudbury, was the first of these.

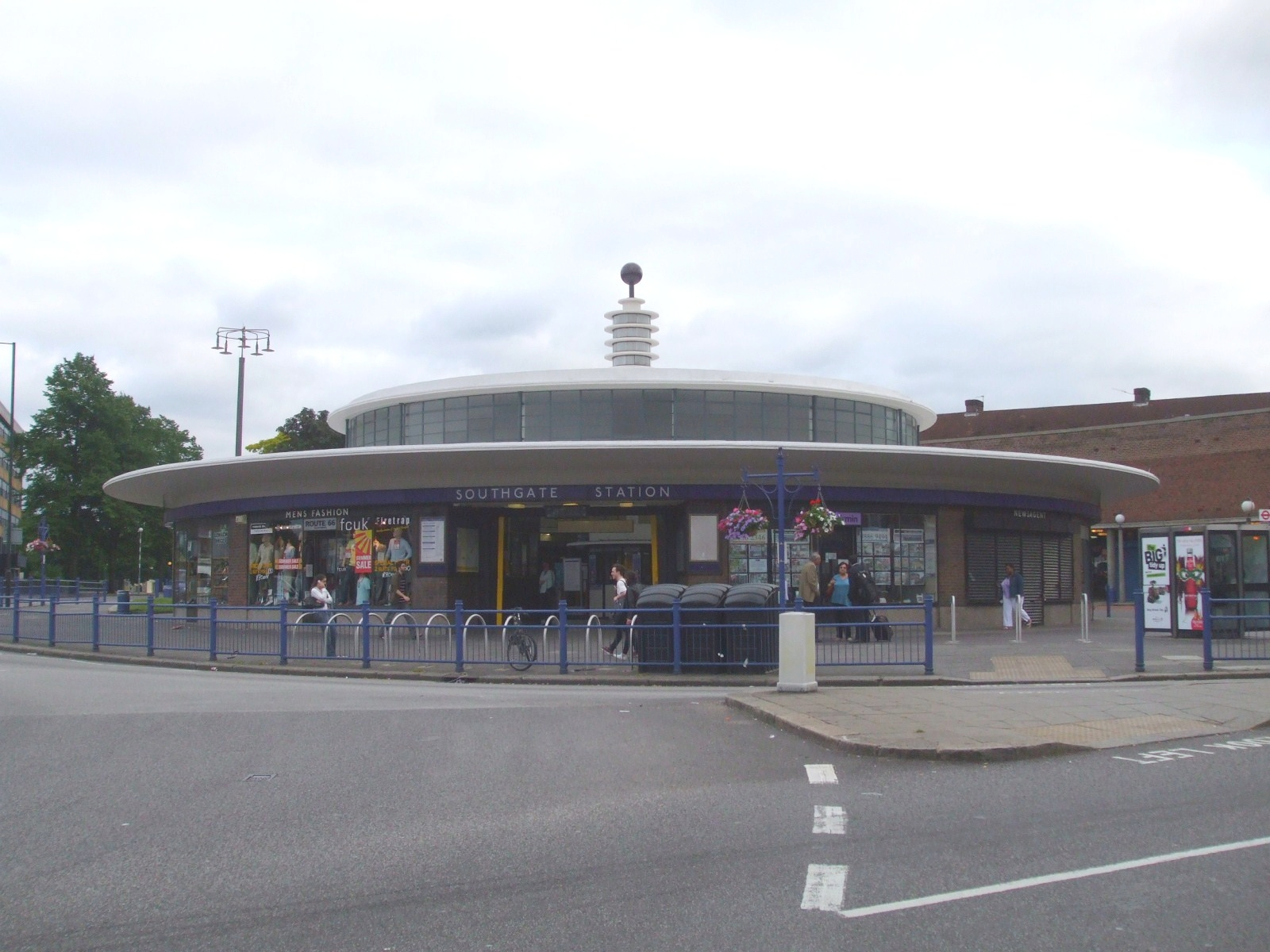
The single-storey Southgate station, Enfield, features a canopied roof supported on a single central column above a band of clerestory windows that is topped by an illuminated glass and bronze feature.

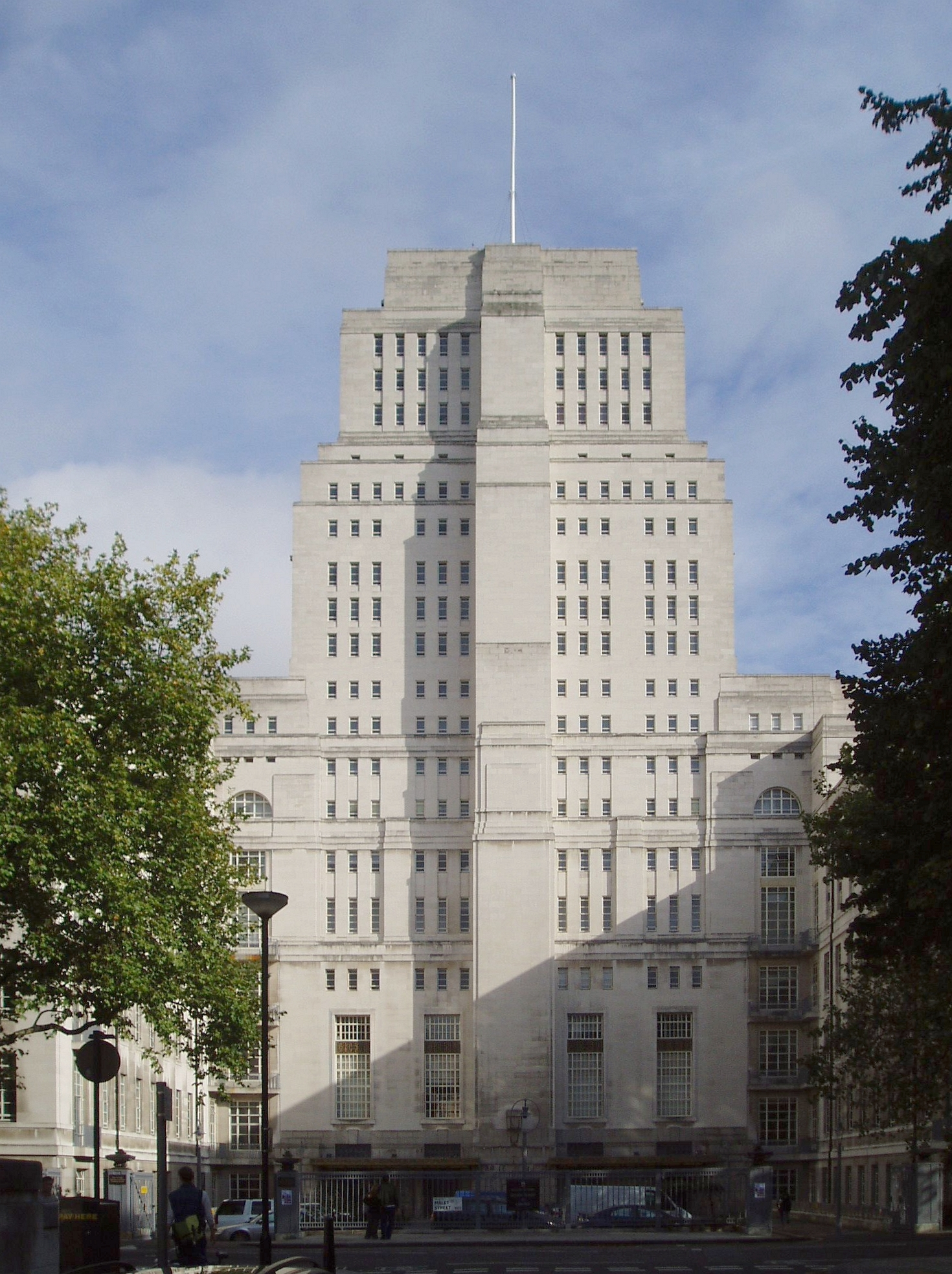
The designs for new buildings for the University of London, Bloomsbury, were gradually revised and cut back due to a shortage of funds. The 19-storey, 210-foot (64 m) tall Senate House is the only part that was completed and was the tallest office building in London for 20 years.

== Cemeteries ==
Holden worked on the designs for 69 cemeteries for the dead of the First World War as part of his work for the Imperial War Graves Commission (IWGC, now the Commonwealth War Graves Commission (CWGC)) between 1918 and 1928. Up until 1920, he worked as senior design architect and his designs are thought to include two of the initial cemetery designs built at Forceville and Louvencourt where Reginald Blomfield was named as the principal architect. (Note: The principal architects worked with assistant architects, also called architects in France, who worked from offices in St Omer, and in some cases did most of the design work, with the final design being approved or amended by the principal architect they were working with.) In 1920, he became one of the four principal architects for the cemeteries on the Western Front.

Cemetery	Location	Identified casualties (Note: The CWGC records the number of identified casualties contained in a cemetery, although most cemeteries have additional graves containing the bodies of soldiers who could not be identified and whose grave stones carry no name. In some cases the number of unidentified burials is considerable – for example, Poelcapelle British Cemetery contains 6,231 such burials.)	Note
Aubers Ridge British Cemetery	Aubers, France	278	
Avesnes-le-Comte Communal Cemetery Extension	Avesnes-le-Comte, France	329	
Awoingt British Cemetery	Awoingt, France	714	
Bac-Du-Sud British Cemetery	Bailleulval, France	737	
Bapaume Post Military Cemetery	Albert, France	229	
Bellicourt British Cemetery	Bellicourt, France	892	
Bienvillers Military Cemetery	Bienvillers-au-Bois, France	1,198	
Boulogne Eastern Cemetery	Boulogne, France	5,743	
Brown's Road Military Cemetery	Festubert, France	664	
Busigny Communal Cemetery Extension	Busigny, France	697	
Buttes New British Cemetery	Zonnebeke, Belgium	432	
Cambrai East Military Cemetery	Cambrai, France	474	
Cambrin Churchyard Extension	Cambrin, France	1,304	
Cambrin Military Cemetery	Cambrin, France	816	
Canada Cemetery, Tilloy-les-Cambrai	Cambrai, France	248	
Caudry British Cemetery	Caudry, France	654	
Chapelle British Cemetery	Holnon, France	360	
Corbie Communal Cemetery Extension	Corbie, France	918	
Cross Roads Cemetery	Fontaine-au-Bois, France	638	
Dadizeele New British Cemetery	Moorslede, Belgium	871	
Doullens Communal Cemetery Extension No. 1	Doullens, France	1,366	
Doullens Communal Cemetery Extension No. 2	Doullens, France	459	
Dranoutre Military Cemetery	Heuvelland, Belgium	456	
Forceville Communal Cemetery and Extension	Forceville, France	308	The principal architect was Reginald Blomfield, but aspects of the design have been attributed to Holden.
Gorre British and Indian Cemetery	Beuvry, France	901	
Gouy-en-Artois Communal Cemetery Extension	Gouy-en-Artois, France	47	
Grand Seraucourt British Cemetery	Seraucourt-le-Grand, France	496	
Guards Cemetery, Windy Corner	Cuinchy, France	1,246	
Ham British Cemetery	Muille-Villette, France	267	
Highland Cemetery, Le Cateau	Le Cateau, France	560	
Honnechy British Cemetery	Honnechy, France	347	
Kandahar Farm Cemetery	Heuvelland, Belgium	435	
Le Cateau Military Cemetery	Le Cateau, France	513	
Lancashire Cottage Cemetery	Comines-Warneton, Belgium	265	
La Plus Douve Farm Cemetery	Comines-Warneton, Belgium	345	
Lindenhoek Chalet Military Cemetery	Heuvelland, Belgium	248	
London Rifle Brigade Cemetery	Comines-Warneton, Belgium	343	
Louvencourt Military Cemetery	Louvencourt, France	230	The principal architect was Reginald Blomfield, but aspects of the design have been attributed to Holden.
Marcoing British Cemetery	Marcoing, France	181	
Messines Ridge British Cemetery	Messines, Belgium	577	
Montay-Neuvilly Road Cemetery	Montay, France	418	
Naves Communal Cemetery Extension	Naves, France	320	
Pargny British Cemetery	Pargny, France	149	
Passchendaele New British Cemetery	Zonnebeke, Belgium	501	
Poelcapelle British Cemetery	Langemark-Poelkapelle, Belgium	1,248	
Polygon Wood Cemetery	Zonnebeke, Belgium	88	Attached to Buttes New British Cemetery
Pond Farm Cemetery	Heuvelland, Belgium	297	
Post Office Rifles Cemetery	Festubert, France	128	
Premont British Cemetery	Prémont, France	561	
Romeries Communal Cemetery Extension	Romeries, France	703	
Rue-des-Berceaux Military Cemetery	Richebourg-l'Avoué, France	243	
St. Aubert British Cemetery	Avesnes-les-Aubert, France	391	
St. Quentin Cabaret Military Cemetery	Heuvelland, Belgium	455	
St. Souplet British Cemetery	Saint-Souplet, France	591	
St. Vaast Post Military Cemetery	Richebourg-l'Avoué, France	850	
Savy British Cemetery	Savy, France	430	
Strand Military Cemetery	Comines-Warneton, Belgium	802	
Tancrez Farm Cemetery	Comines-Warneton, Belgium	328	
Tournai Communal Cemetery Allied Extension	Tournai, Belgium	819	
Trefcon British Cemetery	Trefcon, France	277	
Unicorn Cemetery	Vendhuile, France	599	
Valenciennes (St. Roch) Communal Cemetery	Valenciennes, France	882	
Villers Hill British Cemetery	Villers-Guislain, France	385	
Wailly Orchard Cemetery	Wailly, France	351	
Warlincourt Halte British Cemetery	Saulty, France	1,286	Some sources list this as a Lutyens cemetery that Holden completed
Wimereux Communal Cemetery	Wimereux, France	3,022	
Woburn Abbey Cemetery	Cuinchy, France	315	
Wulverghem-Lindenhoek Road Military Cemetery	Heuvelland, Belgium	658	
Zantvoorde British Cemetery	Zantvoorde, Belgium	449	

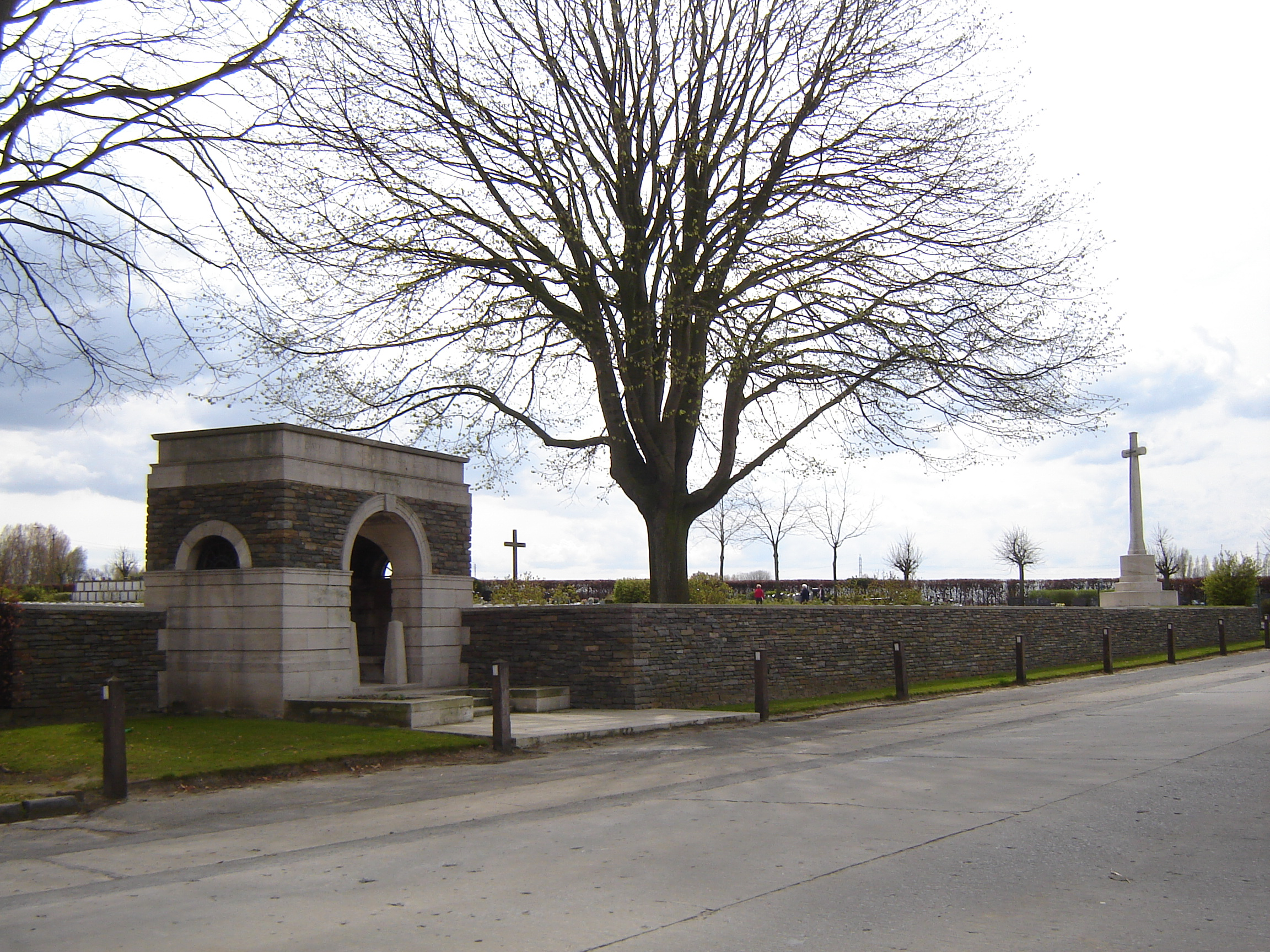
The entrance pavilion at Dadizeele New British Cemetery, Moorslede, Belgium shows the simple style Holden used for the first of his war cemeteries. The Reginald Blomfield designed Cross of Sacrifice is a feature of all IWGC cemeteries.

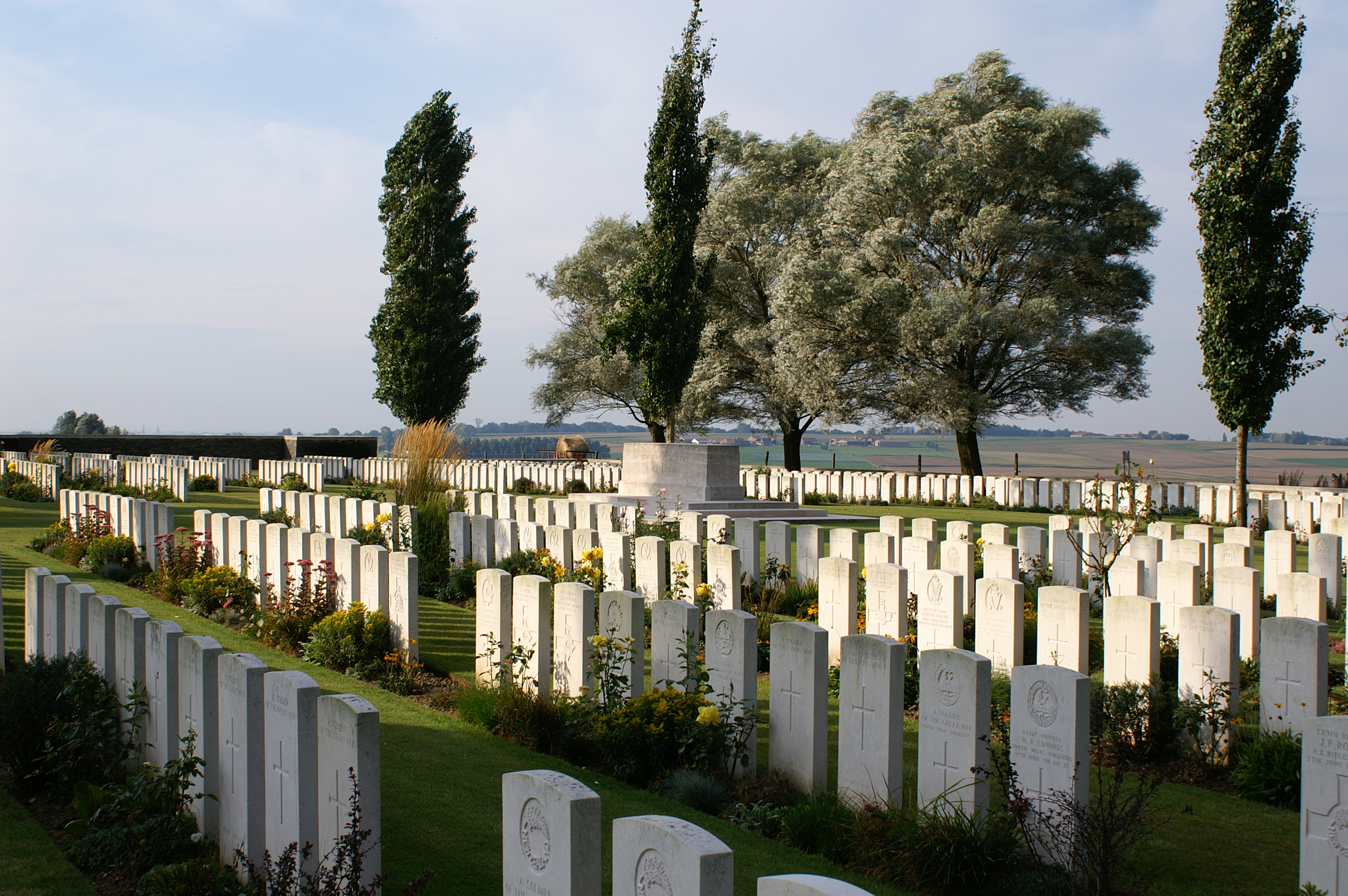
Landscaping and horticulture, seen at Messines Ridge British Cemetery, Messines, Belgium, are key features of all IWGC cemeteries. Edwin Lutyens' Stone of Remembrance features in larger cemeteries.

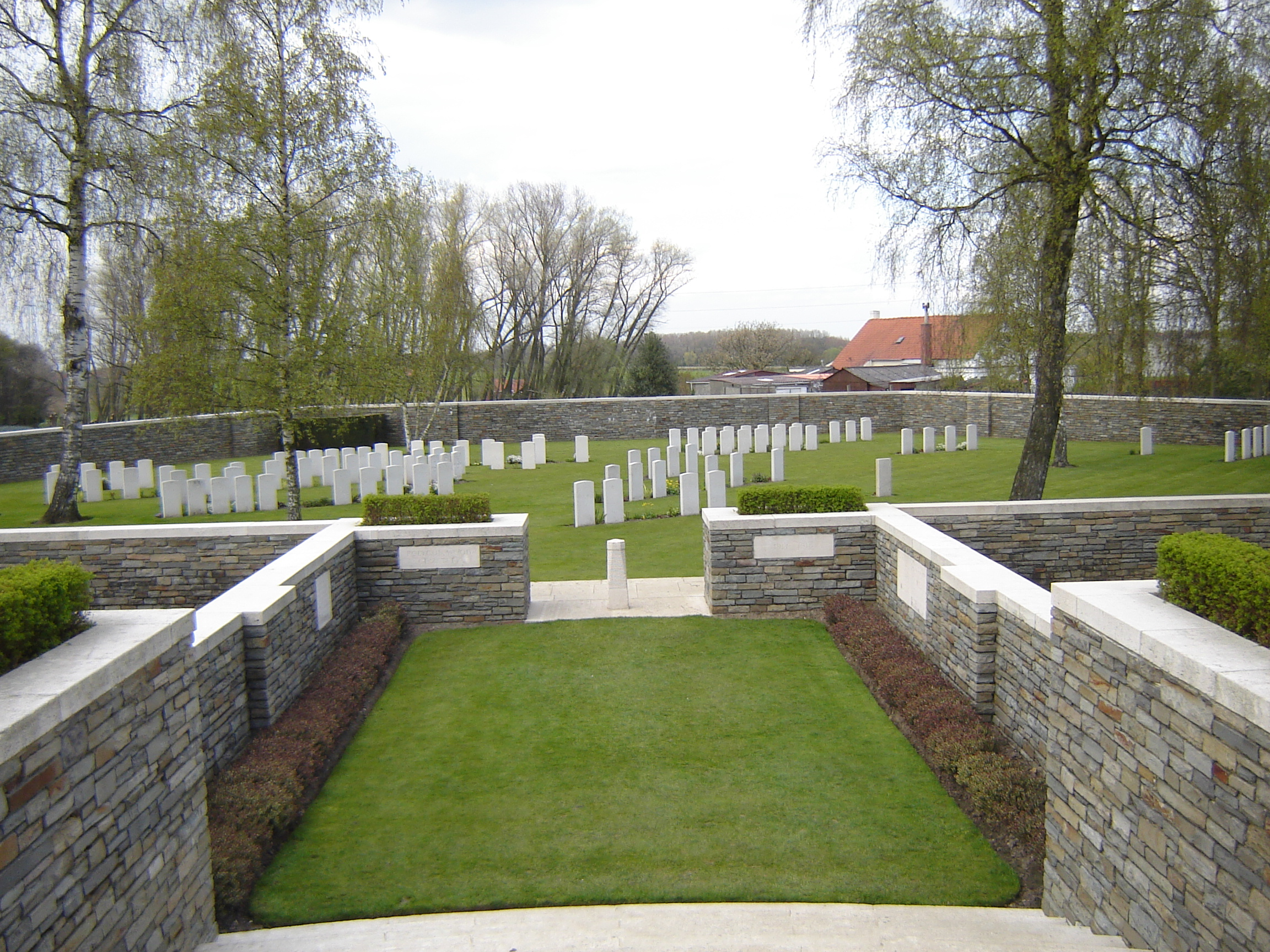
Holden enclosed the irregularly placed graves in the battlefield Cemetery at Polygon Wood, Zonnebeke, Belgium with a low wall of local stone capped with Portland stone. The grass path links it to the adjacent Buttes New British Cemetery.

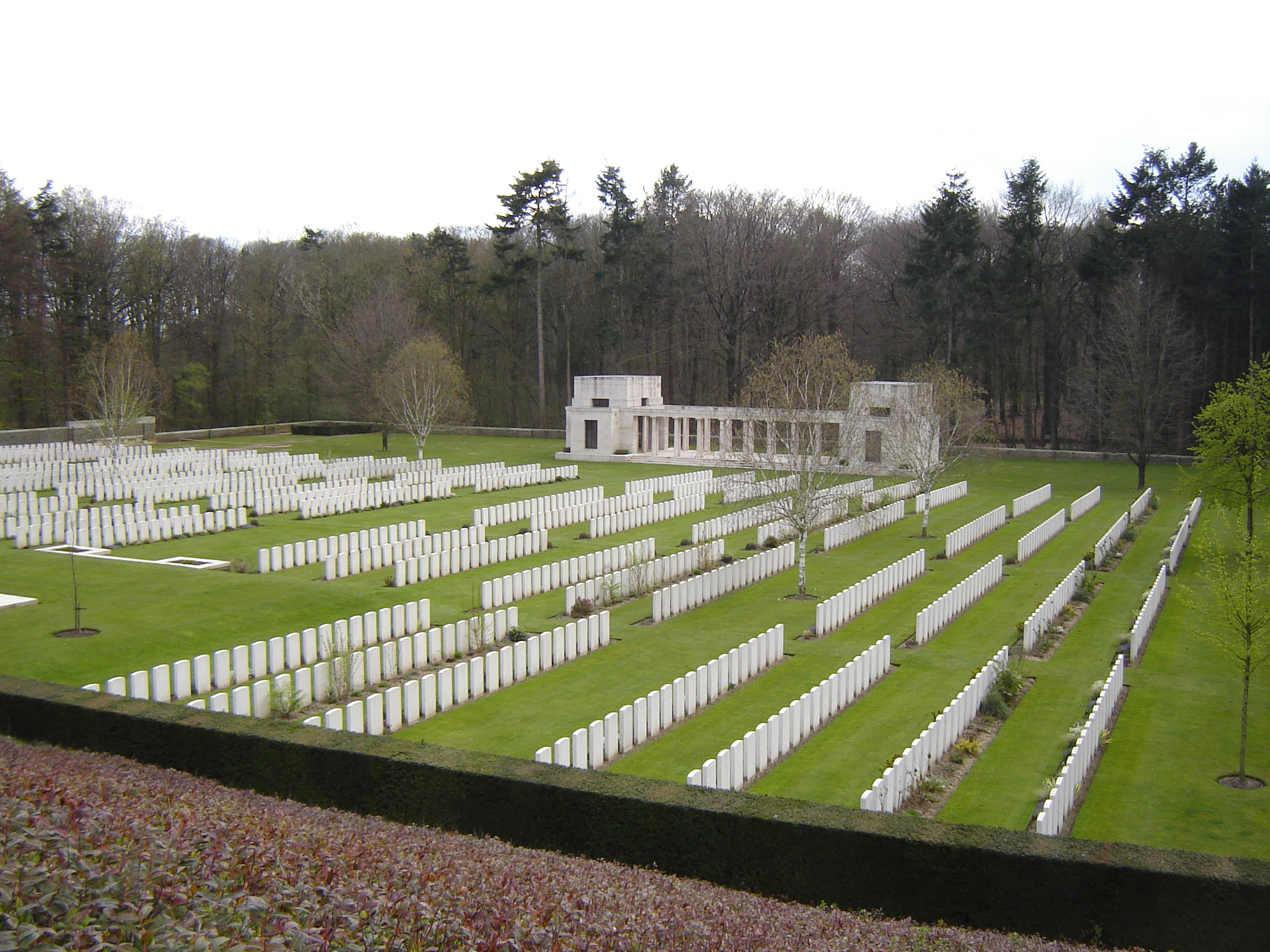
The extremely simplified Portland stone buildings and memorial at Buttes New British Cemetery, Zonnebeke, Belgium are representative of Holden's later war cemeteries.

== Memorials ==
Holden designed two memorials for the missing dead of the First World War as part of his work for the Imperial War Graves Commission between 1920 and 1928. Both are memorials to the missing from the New Zealand Expeditionary Force. They are located in Belgium and are within cemeteries also constructed to his design.

Memorial	Location	Number of missing	Note
Buttes New British Cemetery (New Zealand) Memorial	Zonnebeke, Belgium	378	See also Buttes New British Cemetery
Messines Ridge (New Zealand) Memorial	Messines, Belgium	827	See also Messines Ridge British Cemetery

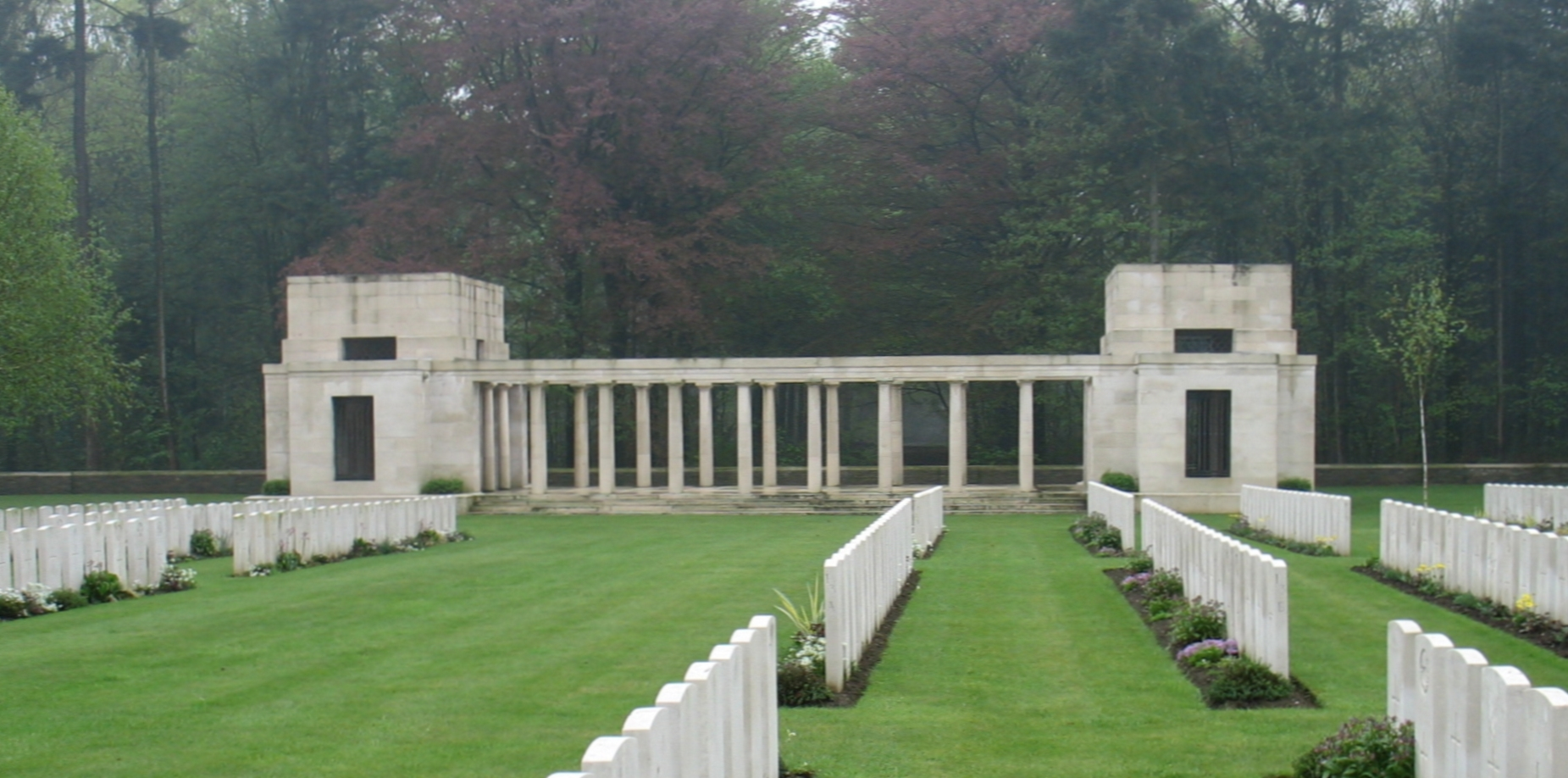
Linked pavilions and colonnades of the New Zealand Memorial, Buttes New British Cemetery, Zonnebeke, Belgium.

== Bibliography ==
- Geurst, Jeroen (2010). Cemeteries of the Great War by Sir Edwin Lutyens. 010 Publishers. ISBN 978-90-6450-715-1.
- Glancey, Jonathan (16 October 2007). "An architecture free from fads and aesthetic conceits". The Guardian.
- Hutton, Charles; Crawford, Alan (October 2007). "Holden, Charles Henry (1875–1960), architect". Oxford Dictionary of National Biography (online ed.). Oxford University Press. doi:10.1093/ref:odnb/33927. (Subscription, Wikipedia Library access or UK public library membership required.)
- Karol, Eitan (2007). Charles Holden: Architect. Shaun Tyas. ISBN 978-1-900289-81-8.
- Powers, Alan (2007). "Holden, Charles (Henry)". Grove Art Online. Oxford University Press.
- Sutcliffe, Anthony (2006). London: An Architectural History. Yale University Press. ISBN 0-300-11006-5.
