= Buttes New British Cemetery (New Zealand) Memorial =

War memorial in Zonnebeke, Belgium

- Commonwealth War Graves Commission
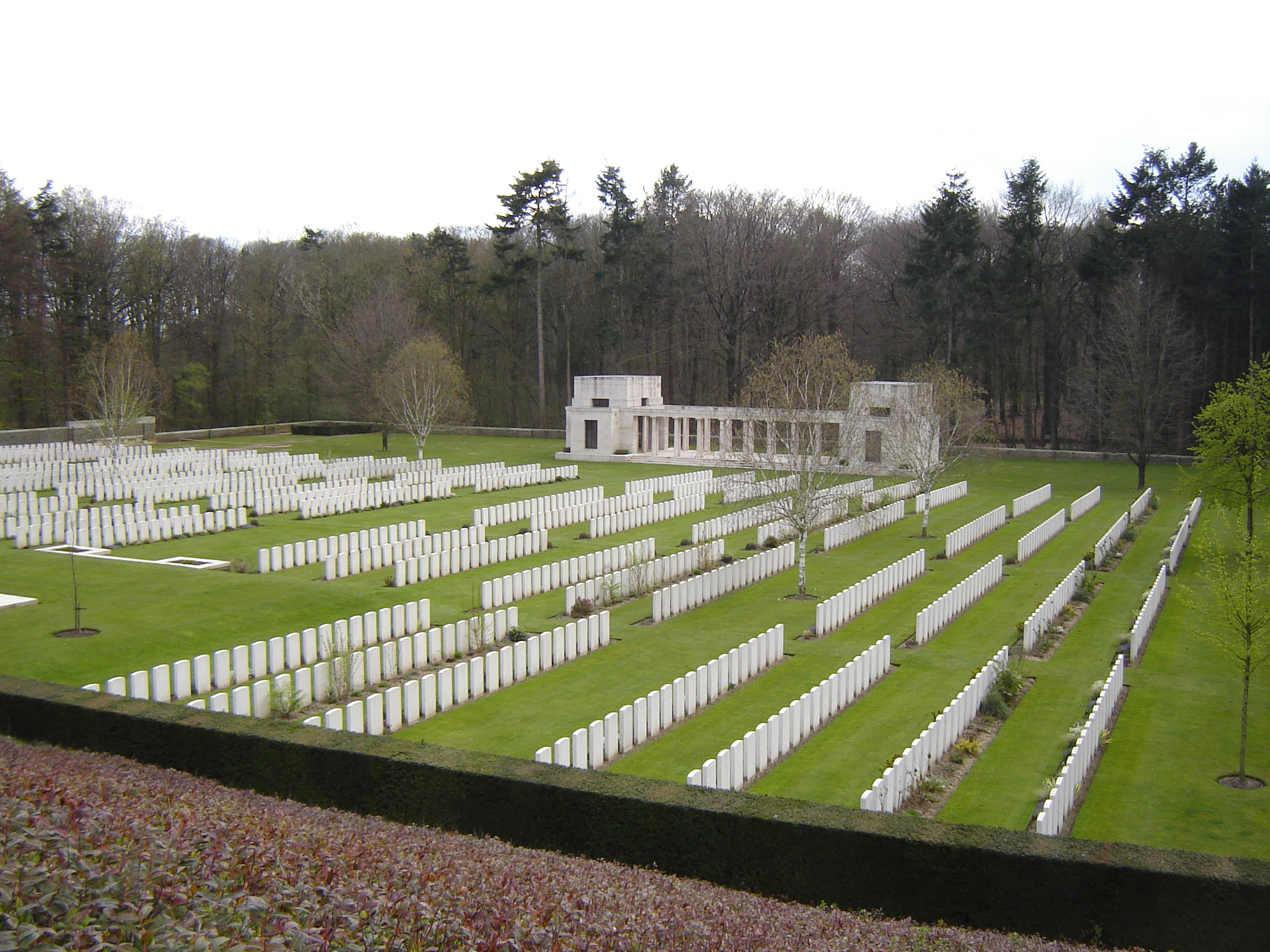
- Buttes New British Cemetery, with the New Zealand Memorial to the Missing in the background
- For New Zealand Expeditionary Force
- Location: 50°51′20″N 02°59′29″E; Zonnebeke, Belgium
- Designed by: Charles Holden
- Here are recorded the names of officers and men of New Zealand who fell in the Polygon Wood sector September 1917 to May 1918 and whose graves are known only to God.

The Buttes New British Cemetery (New Zealand) Memorial is a World War I memorial, located in Buttes New British Cemetery, near the town of Zonnebeke, Belgium. It commemorates 378 officers and men of the New Zealand Division who were killed in the vicinity and have no known grave.

== History ==
The Polygon Wood sector was part of the Ypres Salient and the scene of heavy fighting for most of World War I. It was originally held by the Allied forces but lost to the Germans in 1915. It was recaptured in September 1917 by the Australian 5th Division. After the First Battle of Passchendaele (12 October), soldiers of the New Zealand Division wintered in the area until February 1918, when they were sent to a rest area, before being transferred to the Somme during the German spring offensive. Consequently, many of those killed in action or who died of their wounds during this period were buried in the vicinity. After the war, over 2,000 of the Allied soldiers buried around Polygon Wood in wartime graves were re-interred in Buttes New British Cemetery, located in the north-eastern corner of Polygon Wood.

== The Memorial ==
The New Zealand Memorial to the Missing, designed by the English architect Charles Holden, lists 378 officers and men of the New Zealand Division with no known grave who were killed between September 1917 and May 1918 while serving in the Polygon Wood sector or in the Battle of Polygon Wood. Most of those commemorated were from the Otago Regiment.

It is one of seven such memorials on the Western Front to the missing dead from New Zealand. There are three in Belgium: Buttes plus Messines Ridge British Cemetery and Tyne Cot and four in France: Caterpillar Valley Cemetery (in Longueval), Grévillers, Cité Bonjean (near Armentières) and Marfaux.

Other memorials and cemeteries in the area, related to the Battle of Polygon Wood, are a memorial to the Australian 5th Division and the Polygon Wood Cemetery.
