= Polygon Wood, Zonnebeke =

Forest in West Flanders, Belgium

Polygon Wood Dutch: Polygoonbos
- Location within Belgium
- Interactive map of Polygon Wood

Geography
- Location: West Flanders, Belgium
- Coordinates: 50°51′6″N 2°59′11″E

Polygon Wood (Dutch: Polygoonbos, French: Bois du Polygone) is a forest located between Ypres and Zonnebeke, West Flanders, Belgium. It was the scene for several battles during the First World War and there are at least two cemeteries of the Commonwealth War Graves Commission in the immediate vicinity of the wood.

== History ==
Polygon Wood, near the village of Zonnebeke, was the location of a number of battles during the First World War, beginning in late 1914. It took its name from its shape on maps of the area. The wood had been held by the Germans since April 1915 but was captured by the Australian 5th Division in the Battle of Polygon Wood, which took place in the period from September to October 1917. Abandoned during the German spring offensive in March–April 1918, the area was the scene of further fighting in September 1918 when it was seized by the 9th (Scottish) Division.

The Commonwealth War Graves Commission maintains two cemeteries in or next to Polygon Wood. The first is the Polygon Wood Cemetery, located on Lange Streve, which runs along the north-east side of Polygon Wood, while the second is Buttes New British Cemetery, which is in the wood itself along with a memorial to the Australian 5th Division, located on top of an old butte.

== Gallery ==
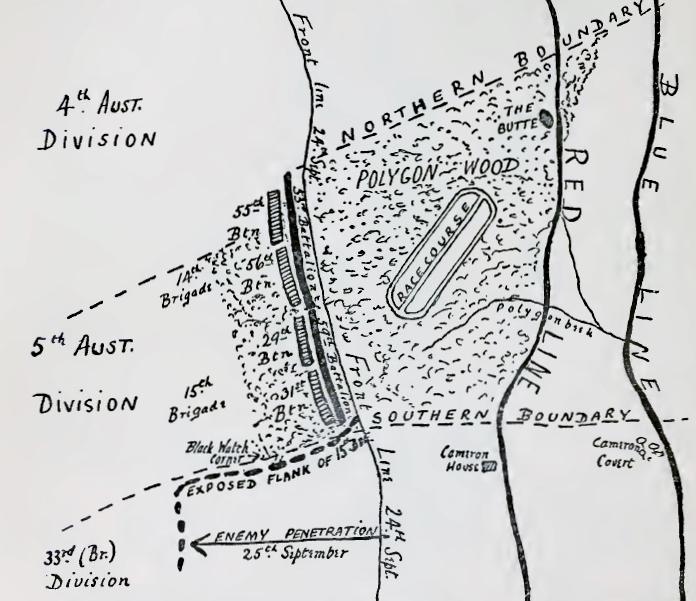
A map of Polygon Wood showing the shape that gave the wood its name

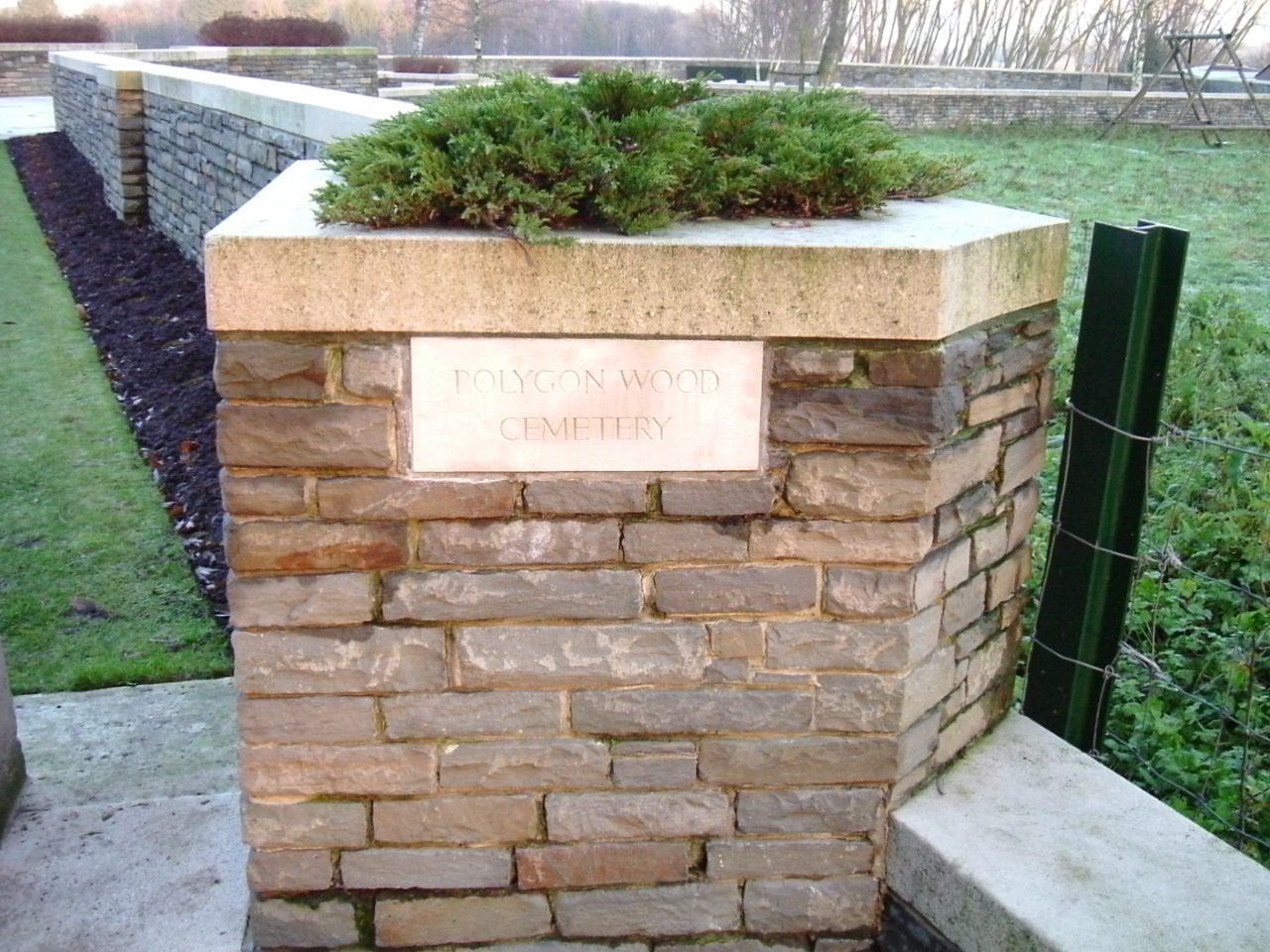
Entrance to Polygon Wood Cemetery

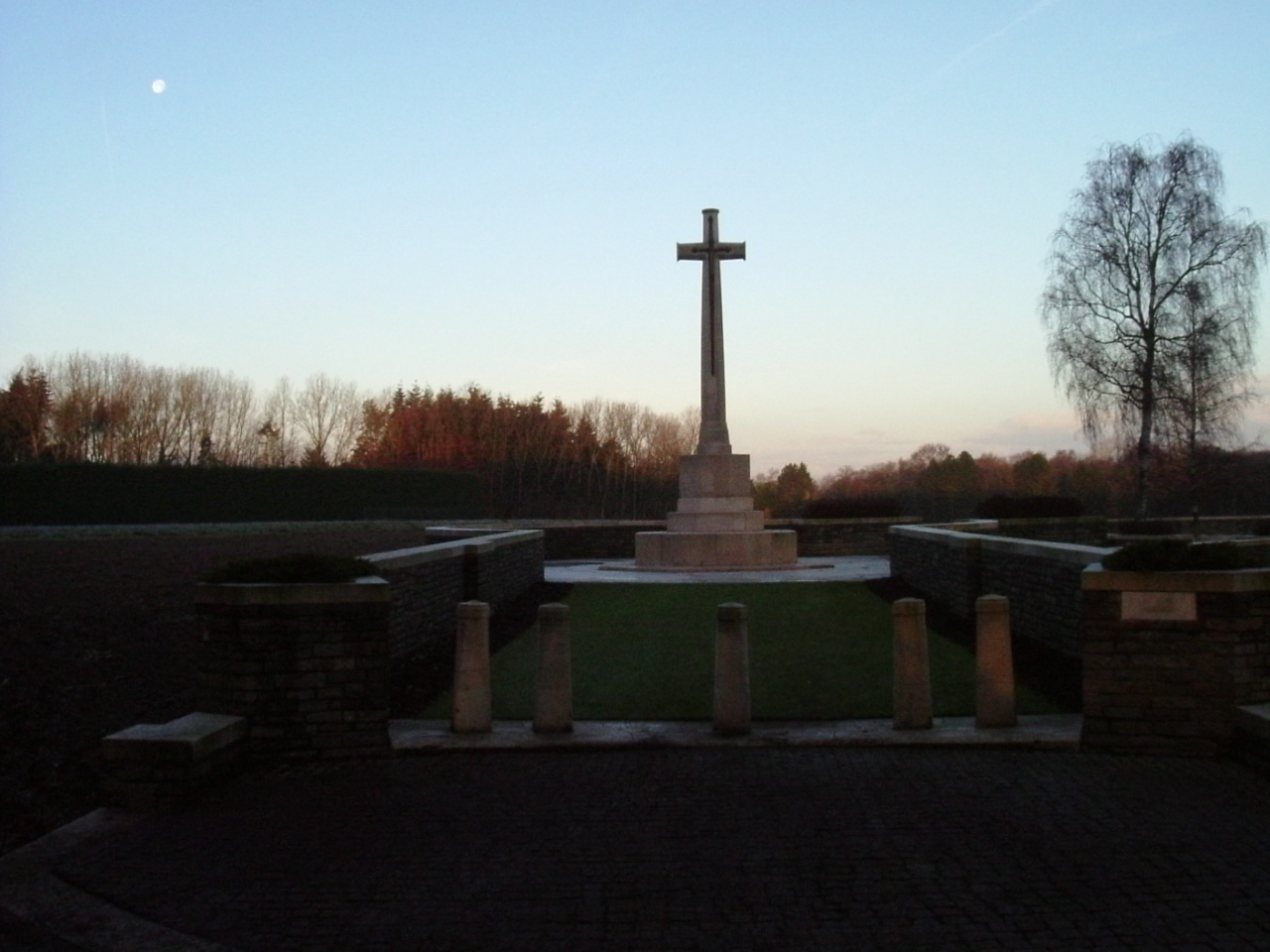
Cross of Sacrifice in the Polygon Wood Cemetery

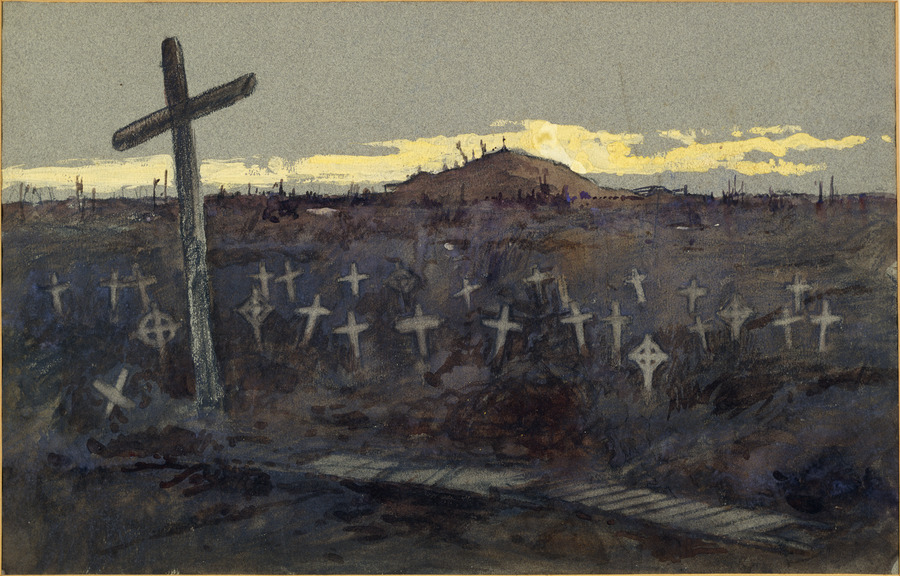
The battlefield at Polygon Wood, painted by George Edmund Butler in 1918
