= Mesen =

- City and municipality
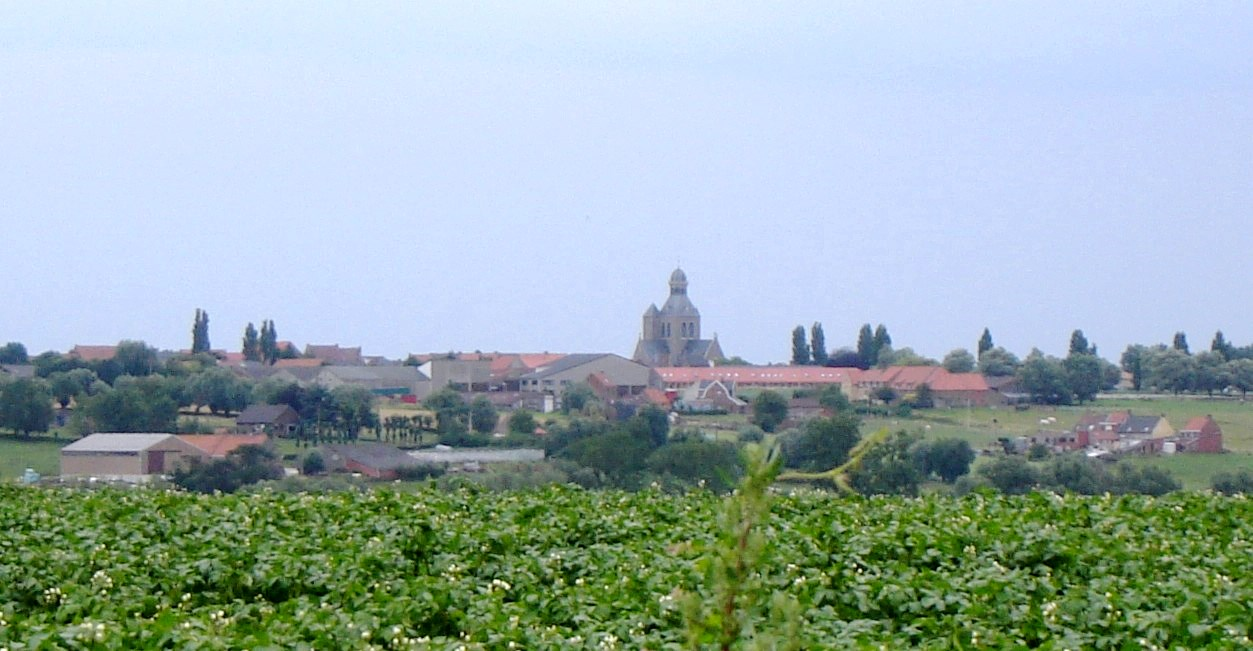

- Flag Coat of arms

- Location of Mesen in West Flanders
- Interactive map of Mesen
- Location in Belgium
- Coordinates: 50°46′N 02°54′E
- Country: Belgium
- Community: Flemish Community
- Region: Flemish Region
- Province: West Flanders
- Arrondissement: Ypres

Government
  - Mayor: Sandy Evrard (MLM)
  - Governing party: Mesense Liberalen/Libéraux Messinois (MLM)

Area
  - Total: 3.6 km^{2} (1.4 sq mi)

Population (2022-01-01)
  - Total: 1,062
  - Density: 300/km^{2} (760/sq mi)
- Postal codes: 8957
- NIS code: 33016
- Area codes: 057
- Website: www.mesen.be

Mesen (Dutch: [ˈmeːsə(n)]; French: Messines [mɛsin], historically used in English) is a municipality and city located in the Belgian province of West Flanders. On 1 January 2006, Mesen had a total population of 988. The total area is 3.58 km^{2} which gives a population density of 276 inhabitants per km^{2}.

The municipality comprises only one main settlement, the town of Mesen proper. An exclave to the west of the main territory is surrounded by the municipalities of Heuvelland and Comines-Warneton.

The territory of Mesen (marked 'I') and its immediate neighbours. Built-up areas are shown in yellow.

Villages neighbouring the municipality:

- a. Wijtschate (in the municipality of Heuvelland)
- b. Warneton (in the municipality of Comines-Warneton)
- c. Ploegsteert (in the municipality of Comines-Warneton)

Mesen is the smallest city in Belgium. It is a municipality with language facilities.

Mesen is twinned with Featherston in New Zealand in part due to the location of the New Zealand World War I Memorial, which has annual Anzac Day commemorations on 25 April.

== History ==
In 1062, Adela, wife of Baldwin the Pius, count of Flanders, translated the bones of Saint Sidronius from Rome to Messines.

Three battles were fought over the town during World War I (1914–1918):

- Battle of Messines (1914)
- Battle of Messines (1917) and Mines in the Battle of Messines
- Battle of the Lys (1918)
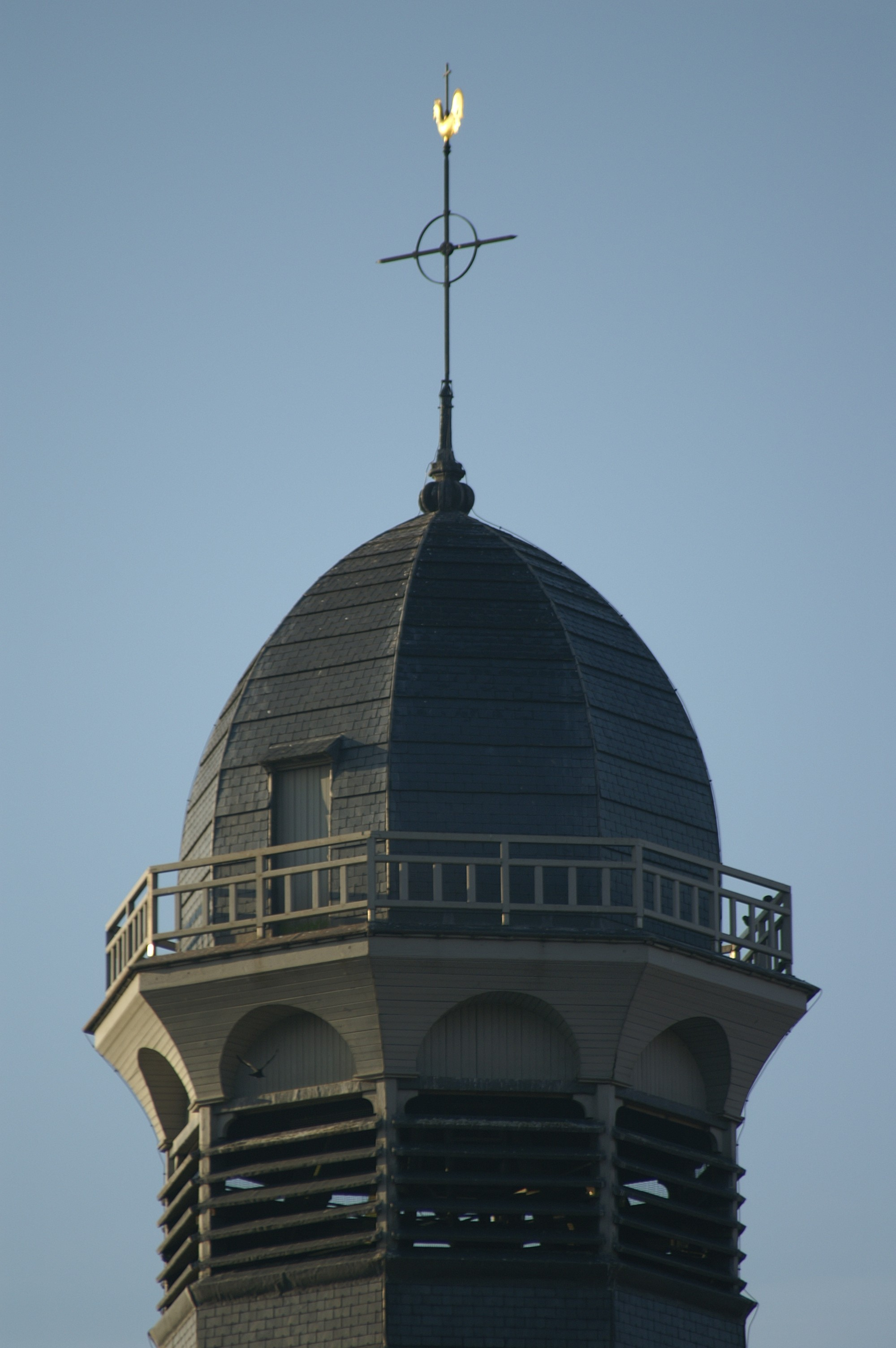
Church tower from Mesen

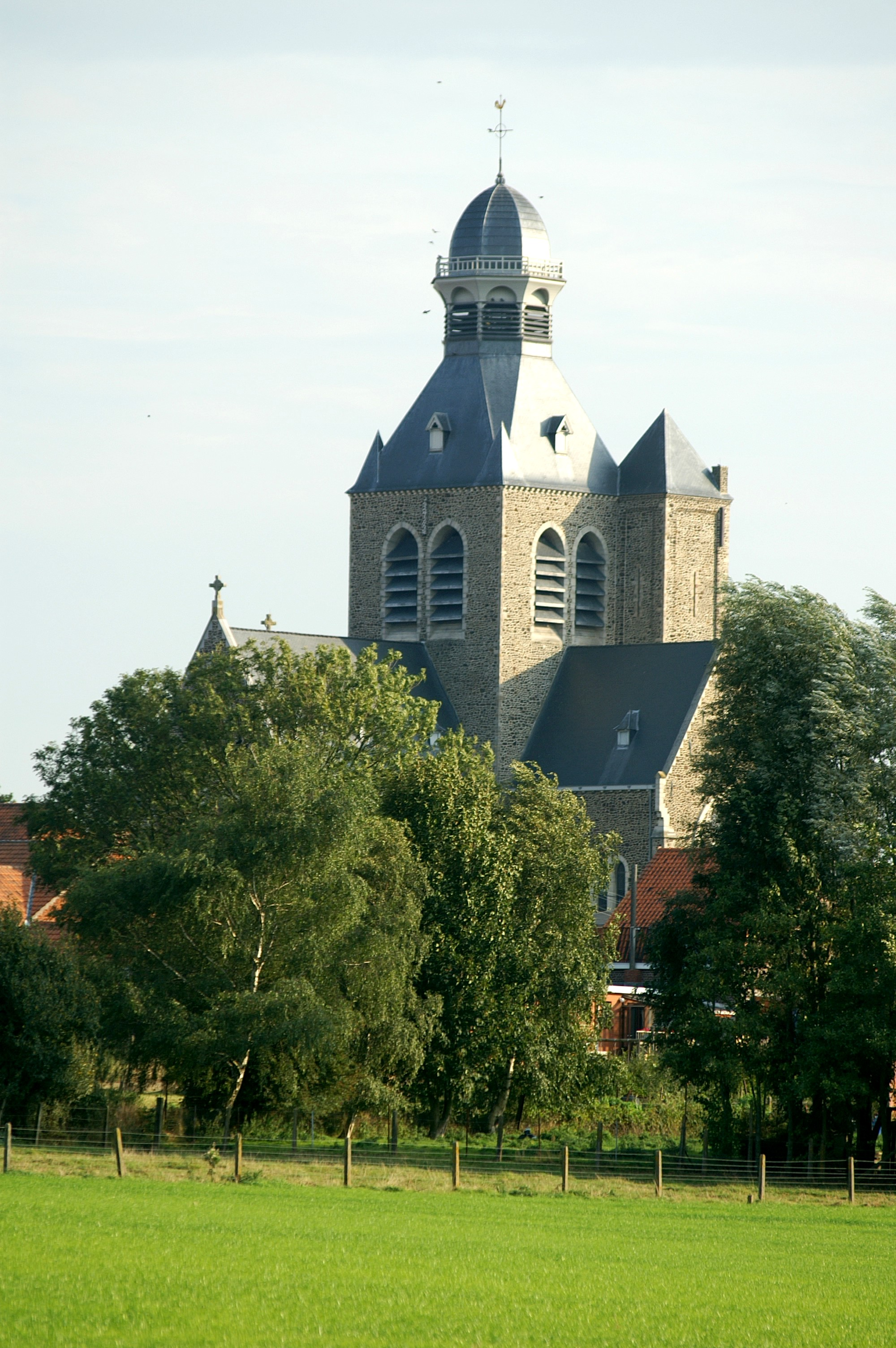
Sint-Niklaaskerk

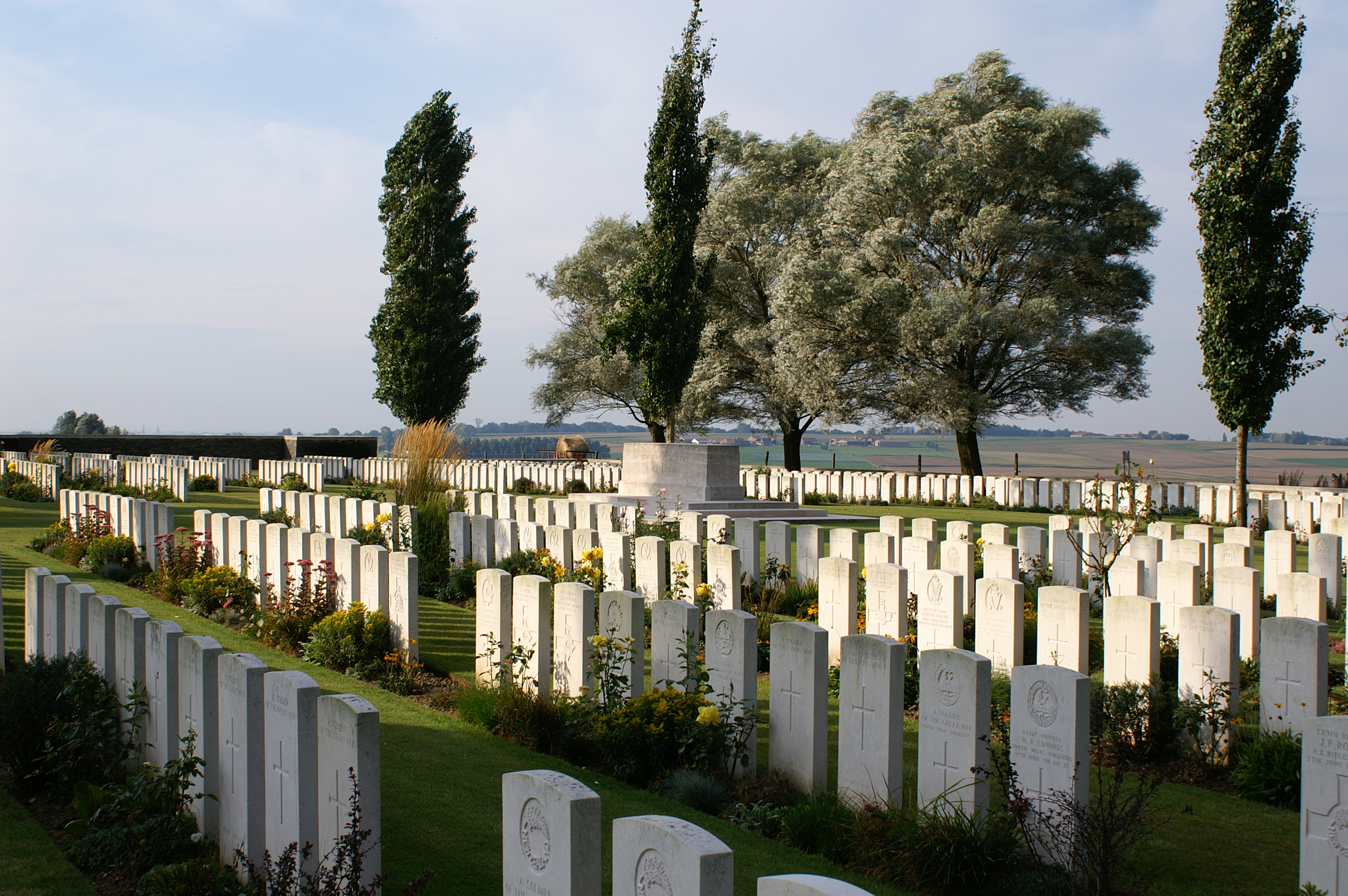
Messines Ridge British Cemetery

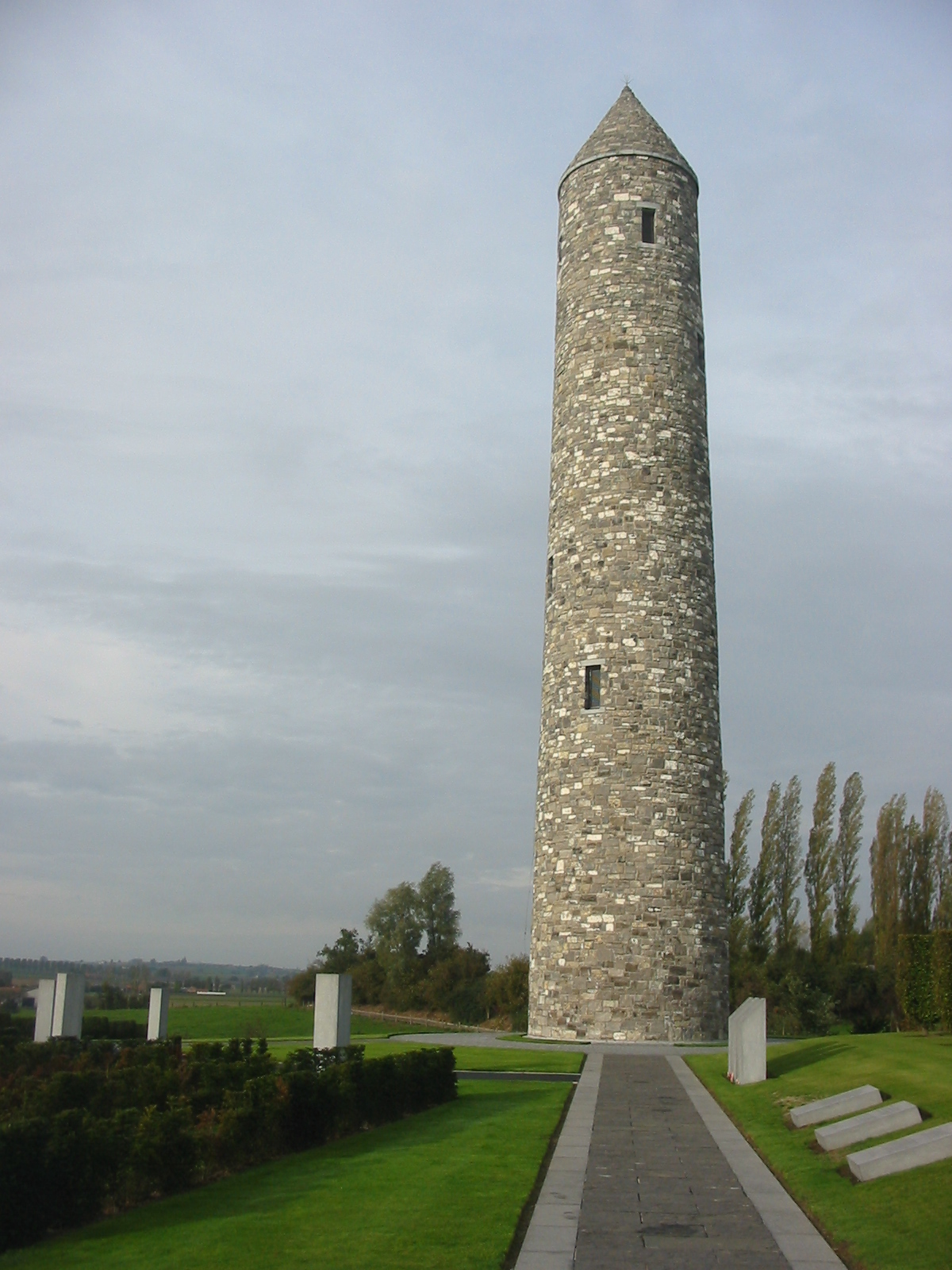
Tower, Irish Peace Park in Mesen

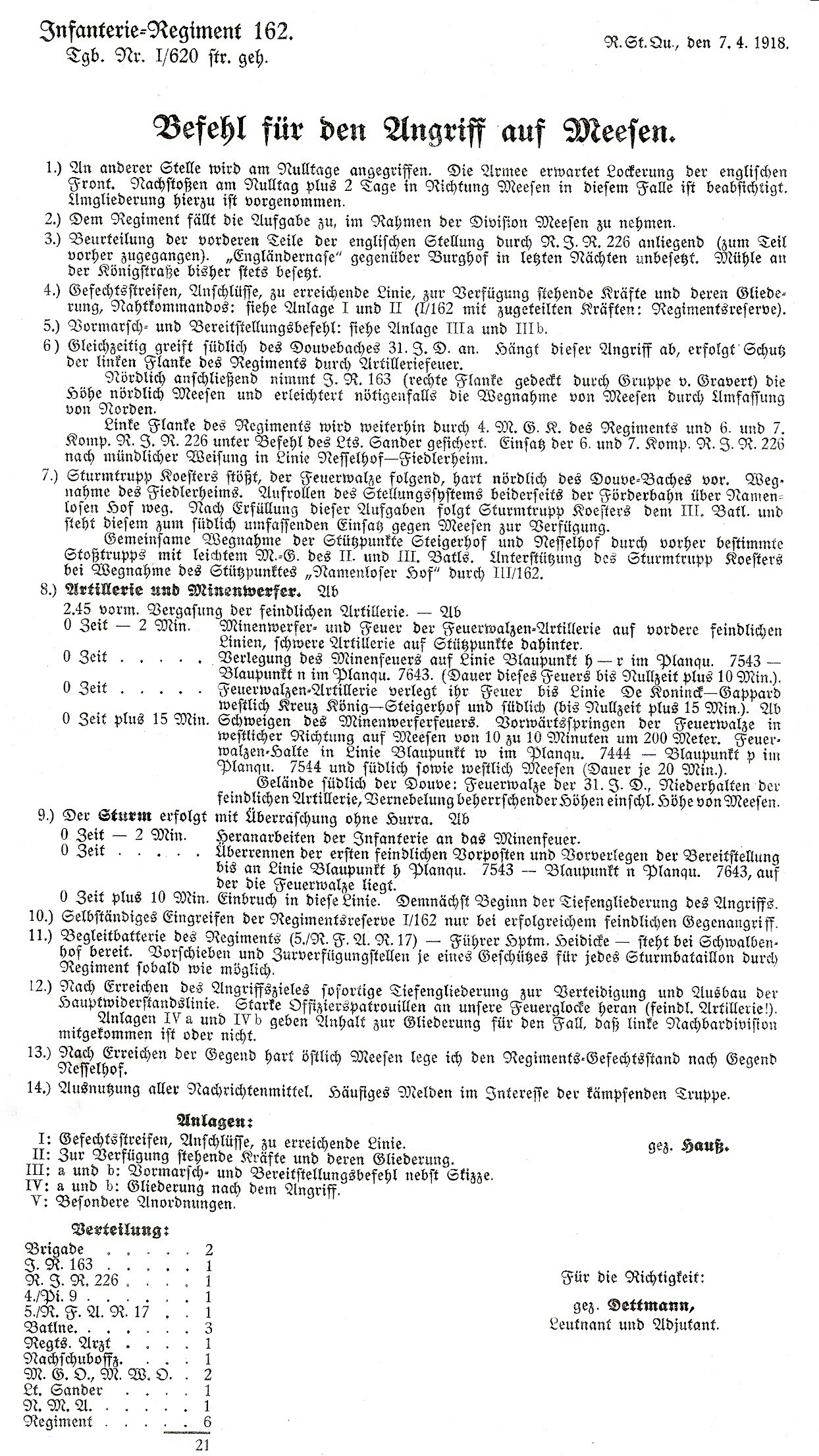
German Order for Mesen 7 April 1918
