= Messines Ridge (New Zealand) Memorial =

WW1 memorial in Belgium

- Commonwealth War Graves Commission
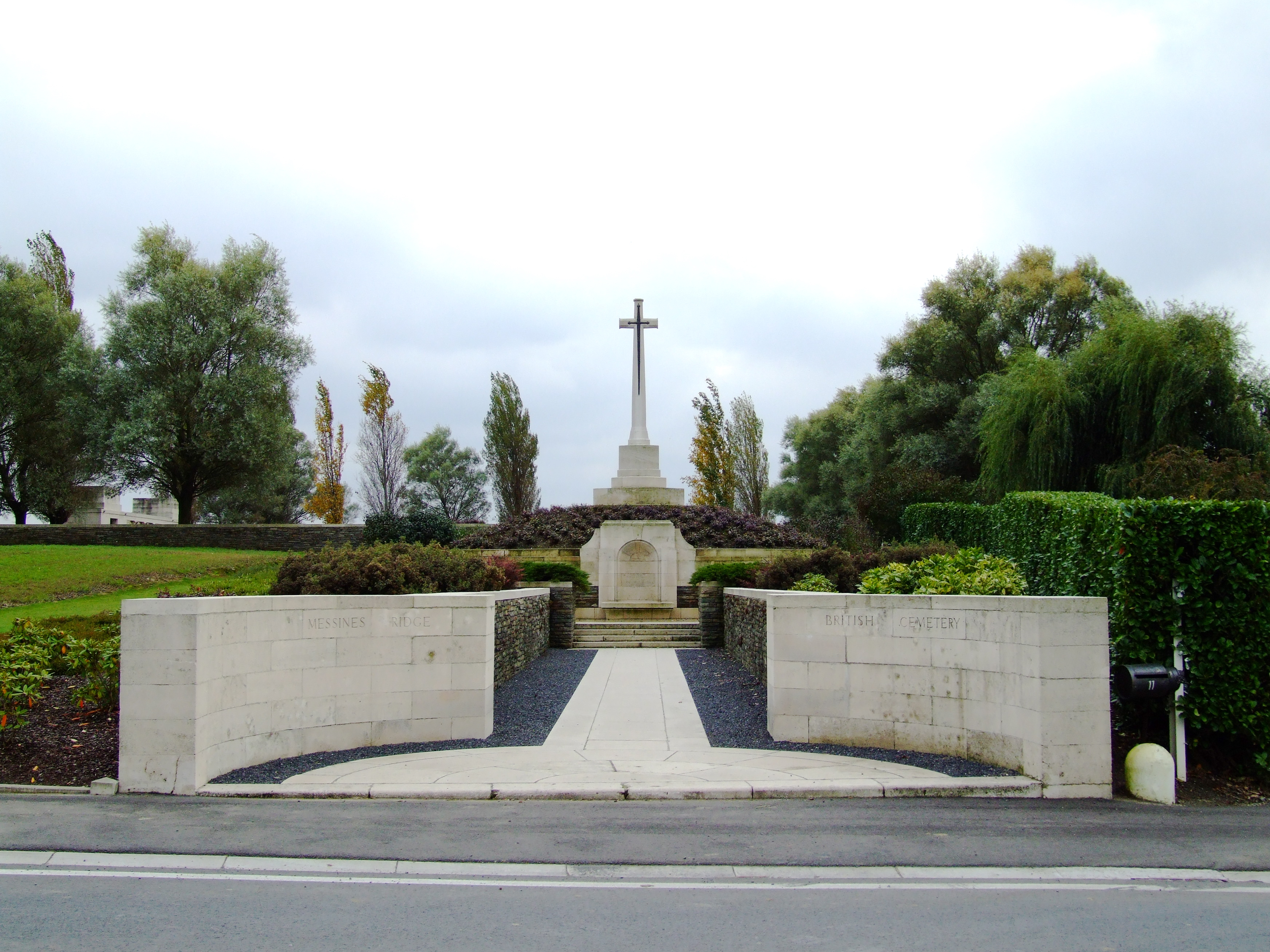
- The Cross of Sacrifice on top of the circular memorial near the entrance to Messines Ridge British Cemetery
- For New Zealand Expeditionary Force
- Location: 50°45′54″N 02°53′27″E; Mesen, Belgium
- Designed by: Charles Holden
- Here are recorded the names of officers and men of New Zealand who fell in or near Messines in 1917 and 1918 and whose graves are known only to God.

The Messines Ridge (New Zealand) Memorial is a World War I memorial, located in Messines Ridge British Cemetery, near the town of Mesen, Belgium. The memorial lists 827 officers and men of the New Zealand Expeditionary Force with no known grave who died in or near Messines in 1917 and 1918. This period included the Battle of Messines.

== History ==
The memorial, designed by the English architect Charles Holden, is one of seven such memorials on the Western Front to the missing dead from New Zealand. The others are located at Buttes New British Cemetery, Caterpillar Valley Cemetery, Grevillers, Tyne Cot, Cite Bonjean, and Marfaux.

The land on which the cemetery and memorial were constructed had been the site of a mill (the Moulin d'Hospice) belonging to the Institute Royal de Messines (a Belgian orphanage and school, itself formerly a Benedictine abbey). The mill dated from 1445, but was destroyed during the war, with the memorial erected where the mill once stood.

Other memorials in the Mesen area to the forces of New Zealand include a white stone obelisk a short distance to the south. This obelisk, one of several National Memorials erected by New Zealand, was unveiled by King Albert I of Belgium on 1 August 1924. This obelisk is now part of the New Zealand Memorial Park. Annual remembrance services take place at the memorials in and around Mesen on Anzac Day.
