= Polygon Wood Cemetery =

WWI CWGC cemetery in Belgium

- Commonwealth War Graves Commission
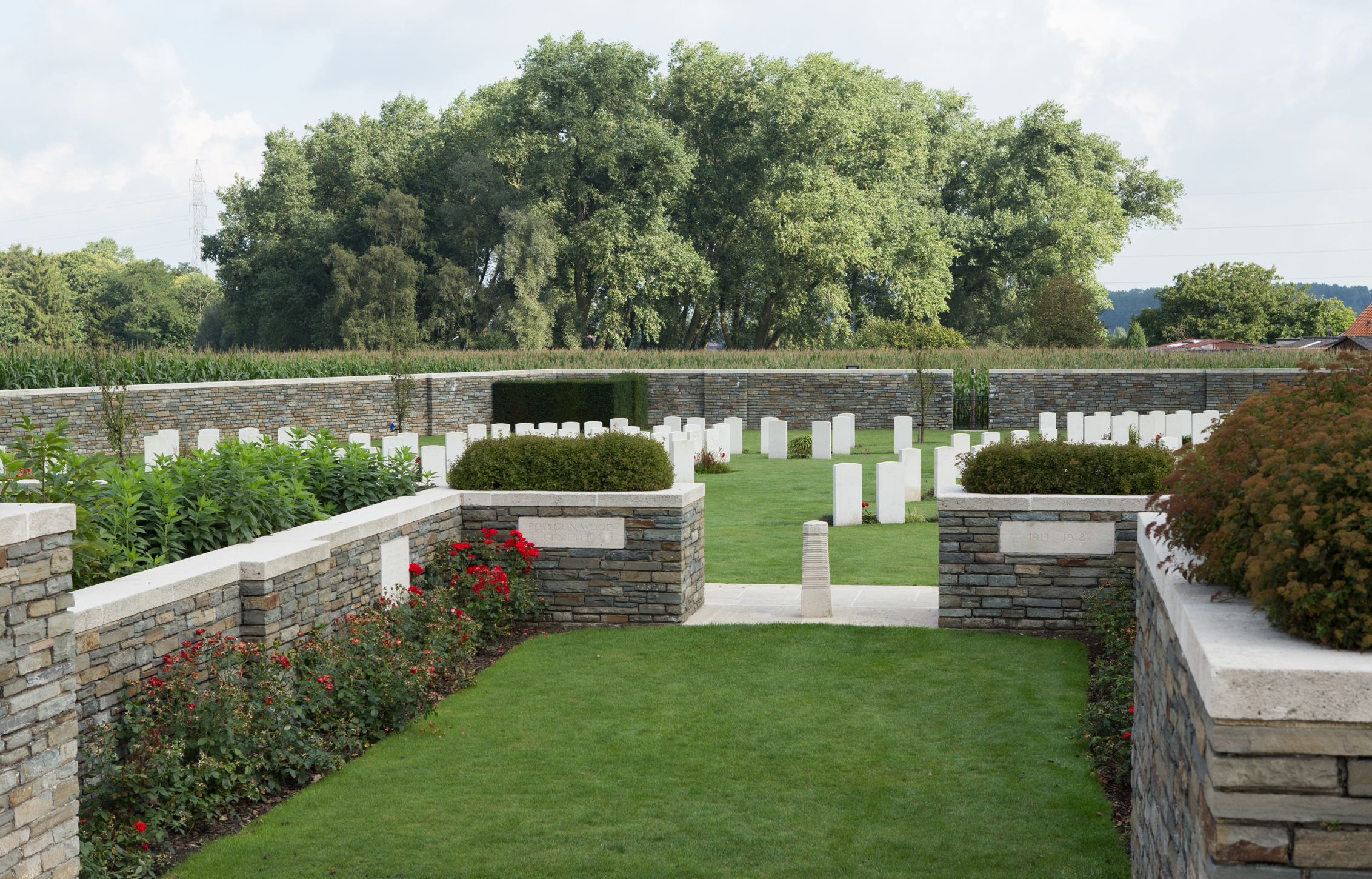
- Used for those deceased 1917–1918
- Established: 1917
- Location: 50°51′27″N 02°59′26″E near Zonnebeke, West Flanders, Belgium
- Designed by: Charles Holden
- Total burials: 108
- Unknowns: 19

Burials by nation
- Allied Powers: United Kingdom: 32; New Zealand: 57; Unknown 19; Imperial Germany: 1

Burials by war
- First World War: 108

UNESCO World Heritage Site
- Official name: Funerary and memory sites of the First World War (Western Front)
- Type: Cultural
- Criteria: i, ii, vi
- Designated: 2023 (45th session)
- Reference no.: 1567-FL09

Polygon Wood Cemetery is a Commonwealth War Graves Commission burial ground for the dead of the First World War. It is located in Belgium, in what was the Ypres Salient on the Western Front.

== History ==
Polygon Wood, near the village of Zonnebeke, was the location of a number of battles during the First World War, beginning in late 1914. It had been held by the Germans since April 1915 but was captured by the Australian 5th Division in the Battle of Polygon Wood, which took place in the period from September to October 1917. Abandoned during the German spring offensive in March–April 1918, the area was the scene of further fighting in September 1918 when it was seized by the 9th (Scottish) Division.

== Cemetery ==
The area was originally a German cemetery with over 340 burials. The British established the Polygon Wood Cemetery in August 1917 as a frontline cemetery until it was lost to the Germans in April 1918. It received further interments in September 1918, once it was back in British hands.

Designed by Charles Holden, the cemetery contains the remains of 108 soldiers: 57 from New Zealand, 32 British, and 19 unidentified soldiers. A sole German is also buried in the cemetery, the rest having been relocated. There are special memorials to seventeen British soldiers and thirteen New Zealanders who are known to be among those unnamed.

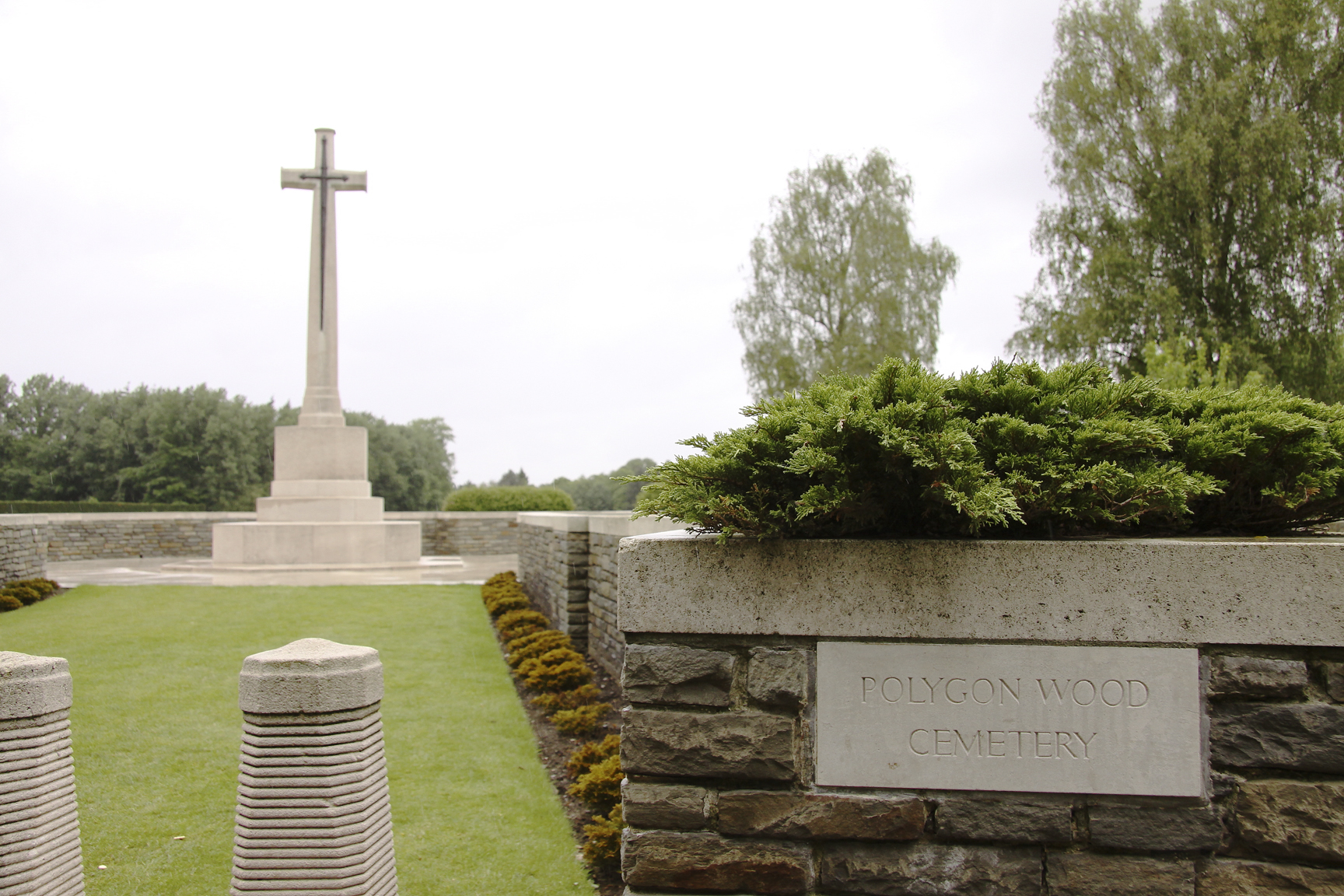
Entrance to the Polygon Wood Cemetery

Surrounded by a wall, the cemetery is laid out in the shape of a polygon. The path from the road to the main part of the cemetery is bisected by a Cross of Sacrifice. Located on Lange Streve, along the north-east side of Polygon Wood, the Buttes New British Cemetery is nearby, in the wood itself. The entrance to that cemetery is directly across the road from that of the Polygon Wood Cemetery.
