= Buttes New British Cemetery =

WWI CWGC cemetery in Zonnebeke, Belgium

- Commonwealth War Graves Commission (CWGC)
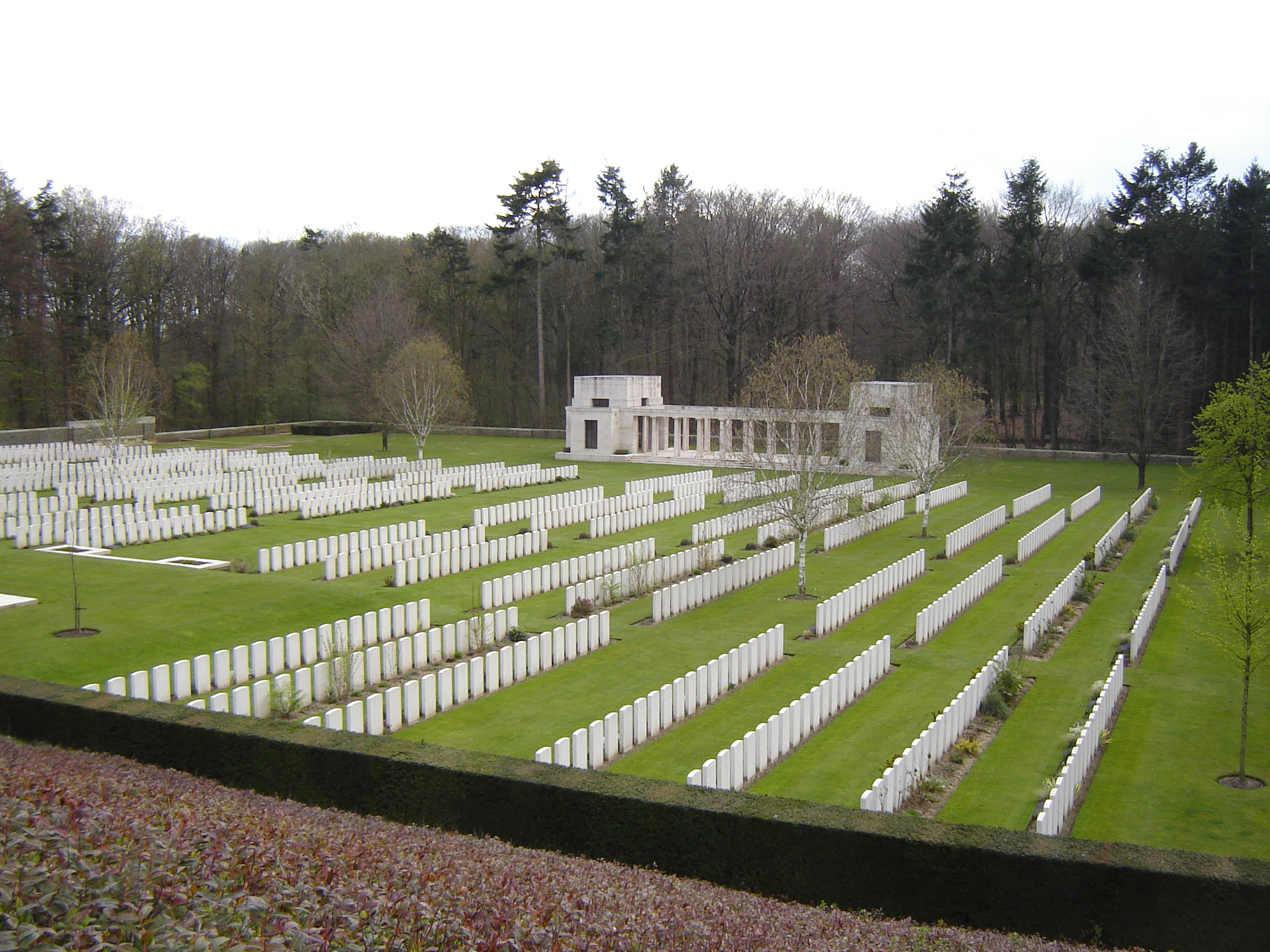
- Used for those deceased 1914–1918
- Established: Postwar
- Location: 50°51′20″N 02°59′29″E near Zonnebeke, West Flanders, Belgium
- Designed by: Charles Holden
- Total burials: 2,108
- Unknowns: 1,677

Burials by nation
- Allied Powers: United Kingdom: 1,317; Australia: 564; New Zealand: 162; Canada: 5; Unknown 30

Burials by war
- First World War: 2,108

UNESCO World Heritage Site
- Official name: Funerary and memory sites of the First World War (Western Front)
- Type: Cultural
- Criteria: i, ii, vi
- Designated: 2023 (45th session)
- Reference no.: 1567-FL10

Buttes New British Cemetery is a Commonwealth War Graves Commission burial ground for the dead of the First World War located in the Ypres Salient in Belgium on the Western Front.

== History ==
Many of the men buried in the cemetery died as a result of the conditions in the trenches located in the Polygon Wood Sector of the Ypres Salient during the winter of 1917 to 1918. After the war, a number of the dead interred in the area were brought to a location eight kilometres to the east of Ieper and re-buried in what was named Buttes New British Cemetery. The cemetery is located in the northeastern corner of Polygon Wood.

The name is derived from an old butte, used as a rifle range by the Belgian Army prior to the war, which is on the western side of the cemetery. A memorial to the Australian 5th Division is located on top of the butte; this memorial was constructed with the assistance of German prisoners-of-war. Polygon Wood Cemetery is nearby.

Buttes New British Cemetery contains the remains of 2,108 Allied soldiers, the majority of whom are unknown. Over half of the burials are British; 564 are soldiers of the Australian Imperial Force, 162 soldiers of the New Zealand Expeditionary Force and five were from Canada. There are also 30 burials of unknown nationality. Most of the dead were killed during 1917, but some date from fighting in the area in 1914, 1916 and 1918. A memorial service is held every year at the cemetery on Anzac Day, 25 April.

Bodies continue to be occasionally discovered in the area and are often interred at the cemetery; five Australian soldiers whose remains were found in 2006 by a drainlayer were buried in October 2007 in a ceremony attended by the Governor-General of Australia, Michael Jeffery and the Prime Minister of New Zealand, Helen Clark.

=== Buttes New British Cemetery (New Zealand) Memorial ===
The cemetery also includes the New Zealand Memorial to the Missing, designed by the English architect Charles Holden, in memory of 383 soldiers of the New Zealand Expeditionary Force killed in the period September 1917 to May 1918 and who have no known grave.

== Gallery ==
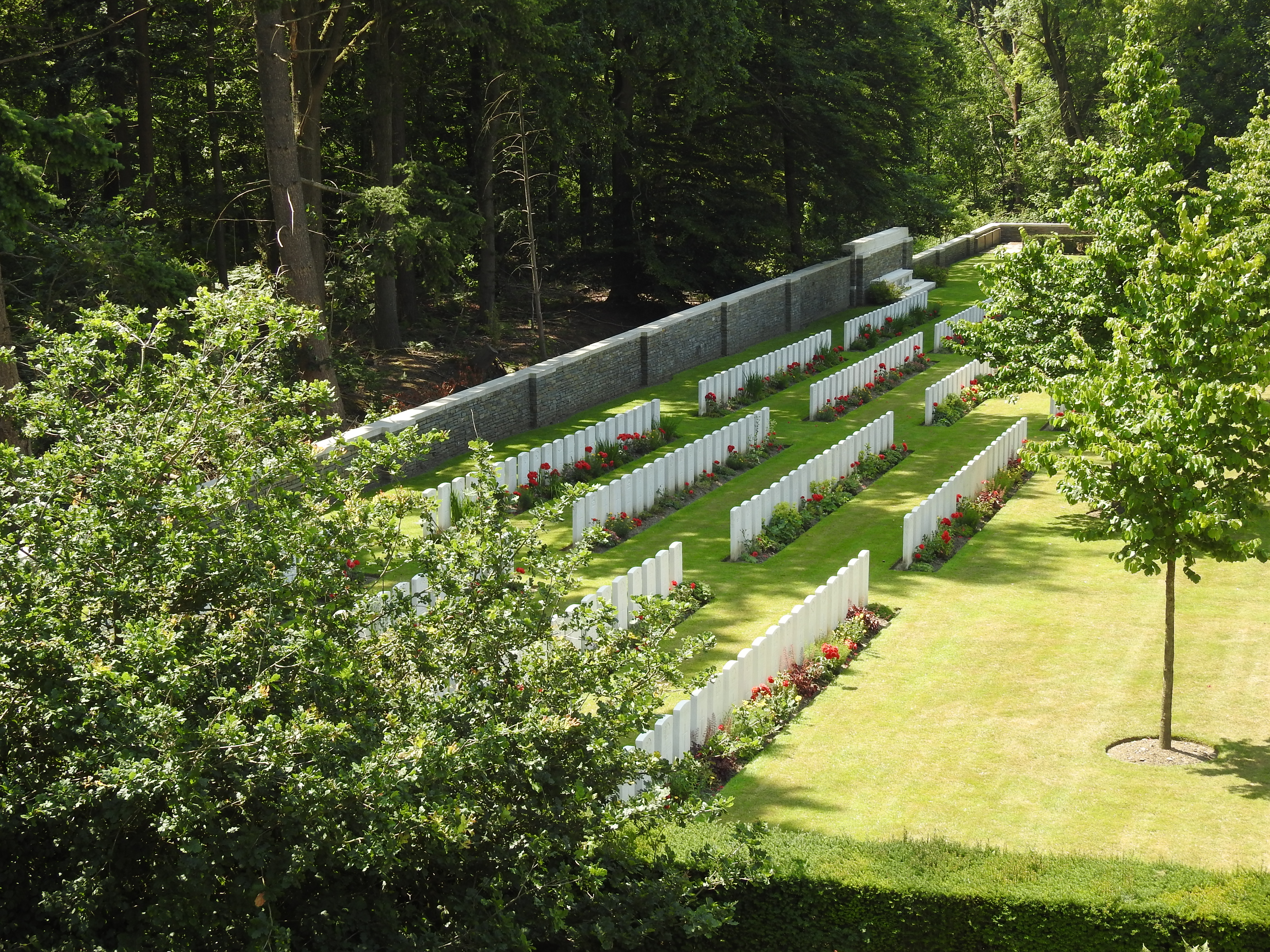
Back side of Buttes New British Cemetery

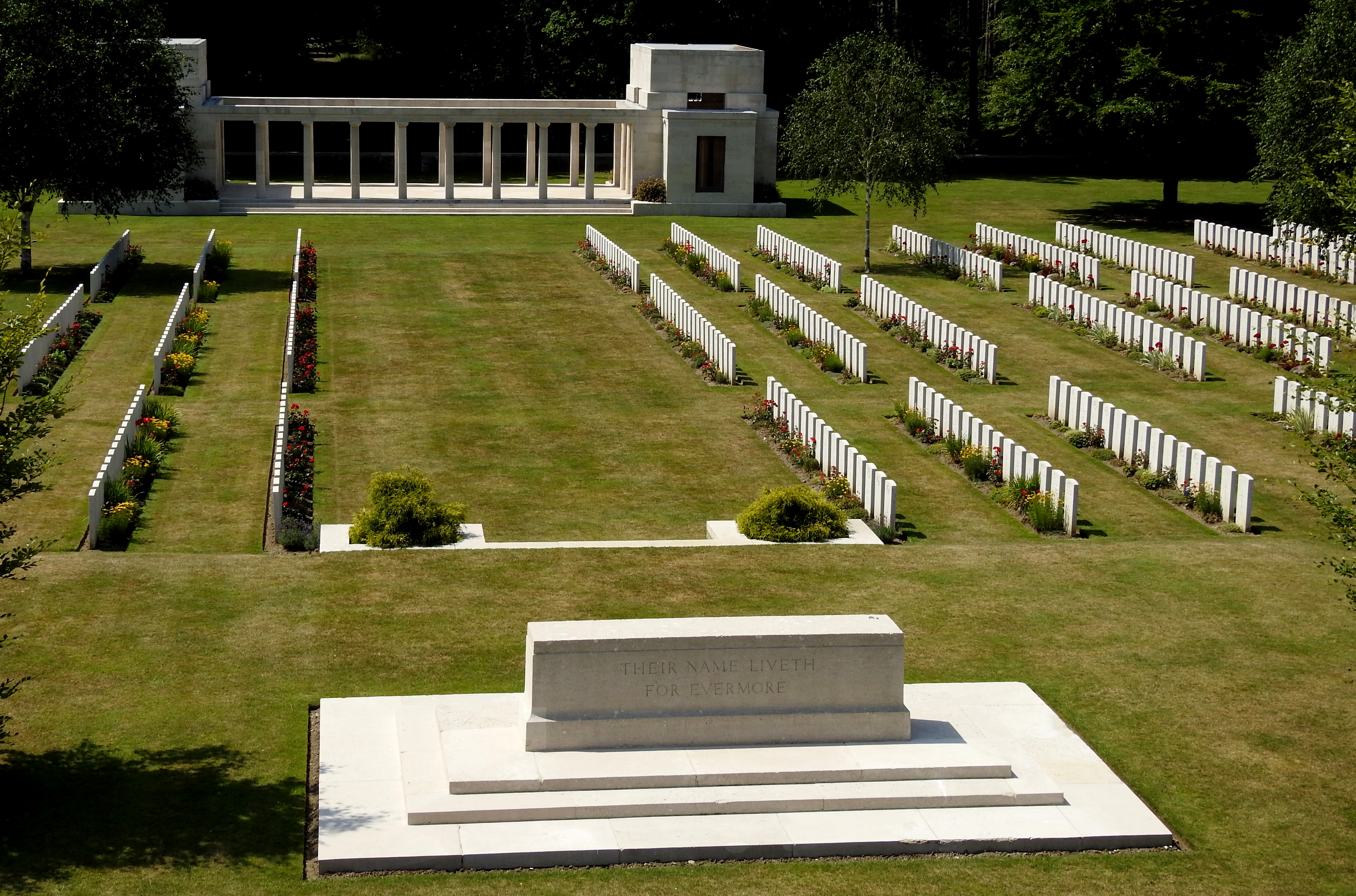
View of Buttes New British cemetery, including the New Zealand Memorial to the Missing.

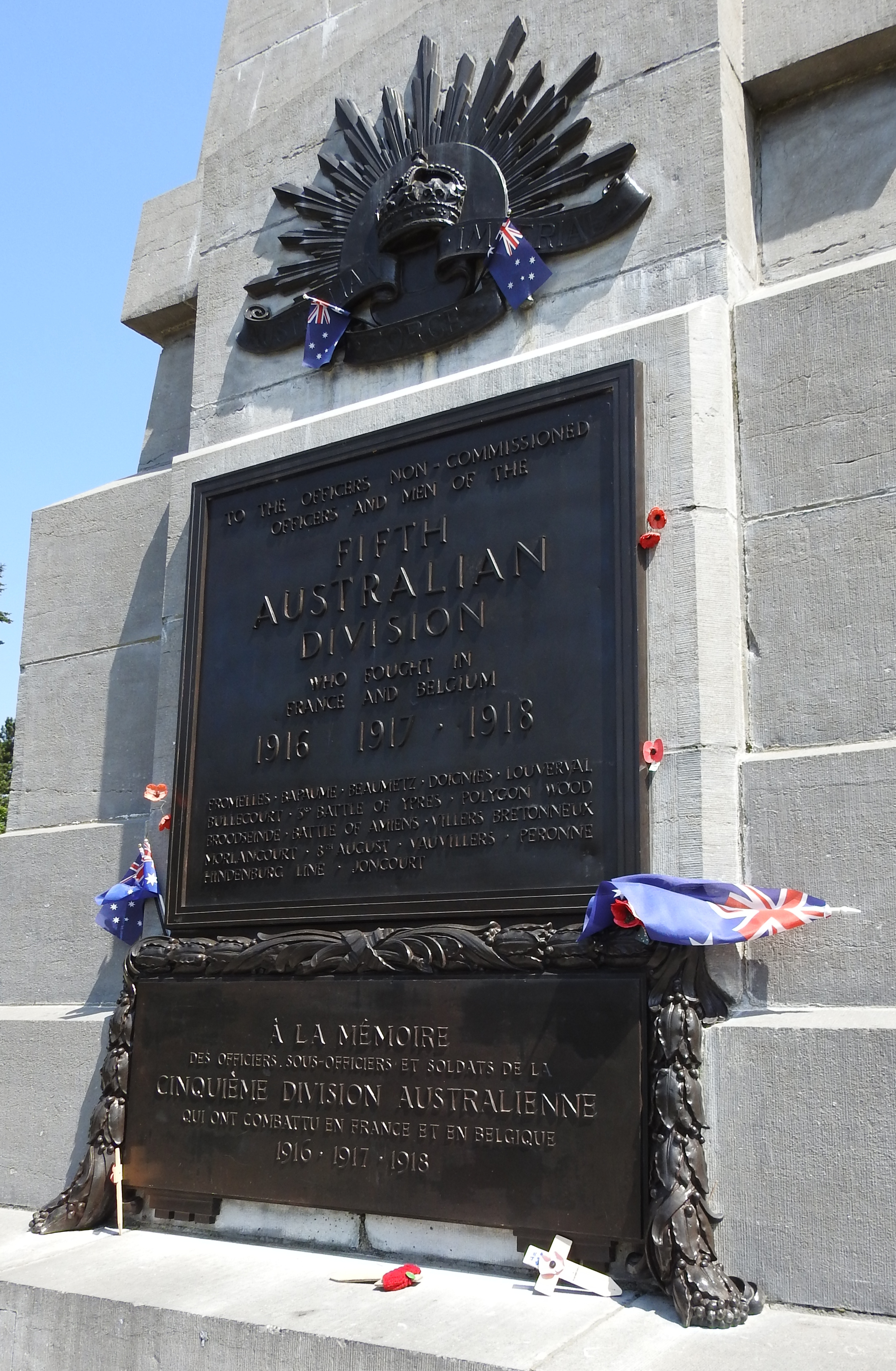
Plaque on the 5th Australian monument memorial, next to Buttes New British Cemetery.

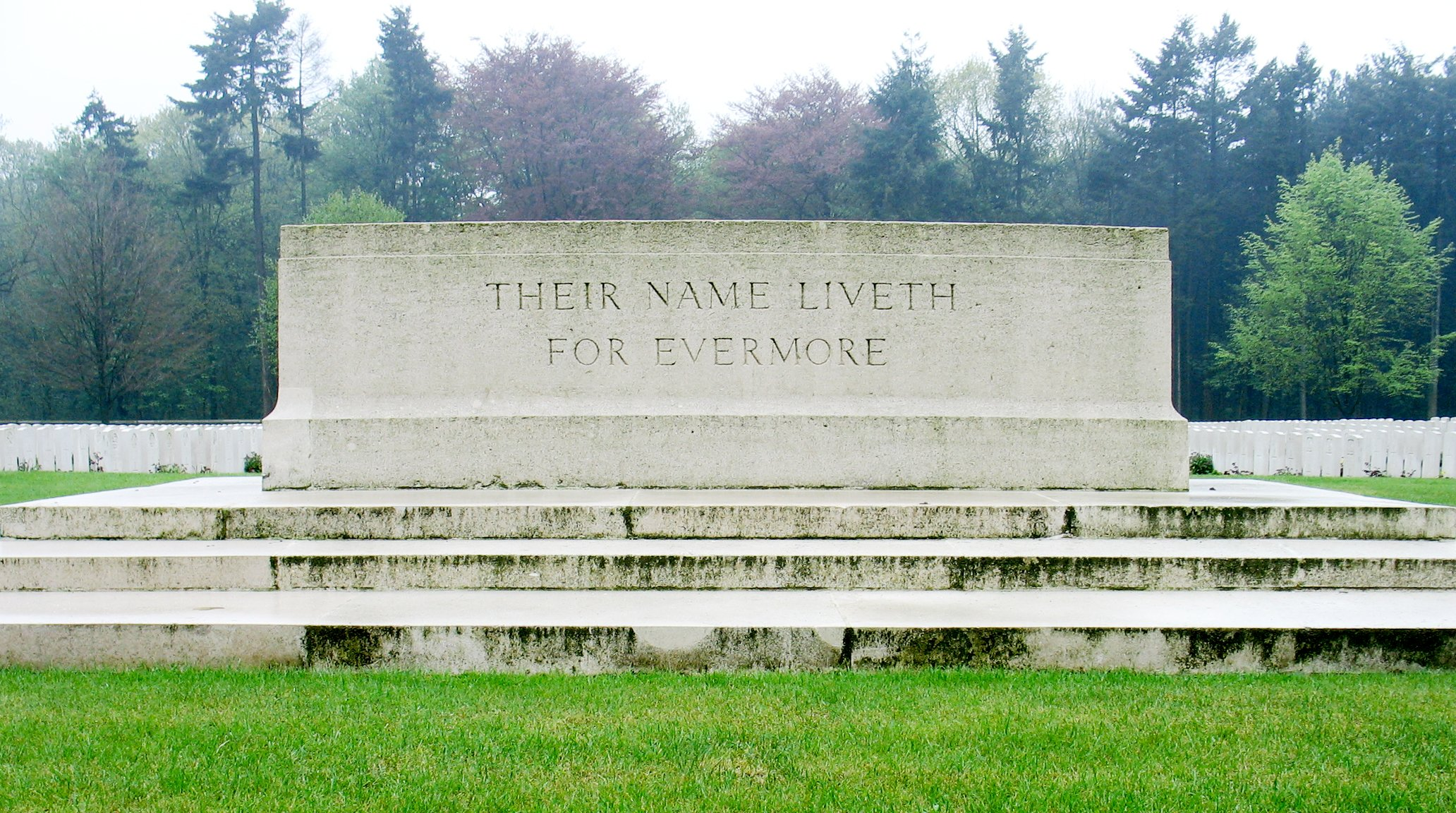
The Stone of Remembrance
