= Clarence Jeffries =

Australian recipient of the Victoria Cross

Clarence Jeffries VC
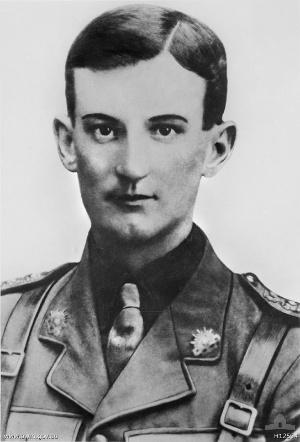
- Jeffries in c. 1916
- Born: 26 October 1894; Wallsend, New South Wales, Australia
- Died: 12 October 1917 (aged 22); Passchendaele salient, Belgium
- Burial place: Tyne Cot Cemetery
- Military career
- Allegiance: Australia
- Branch: Citizen Military Forces (1912–16); Australian Imperial Force (1916–17)
- Service years: 1912–1917
- Rank: Captain
- Nickname: Jeff
- Units: 34th Battalion (1916–17)
- Conflicts: First World War; Western Front; Battle of Messines (WIA); Battle of Passchendaele; First Battle of Passchendaele †
- Awards: Victoria Cross

Clarence Smith Jeffries, VC (26 October 1894 – 12 October 1917) was an Australian mining surveyor, soldier and a recipient of the Victoria Cross, the highest decoration for gallantry "in the face of the enemy" that can be awarded to members of the British and Commonwealth armed forces. He was posthumously awarded the Victoria Cross following his actions in the First Battle of Passchendaele during the First World War, in which he led several parties of men in an attack that led to the capture of six machine guns and sixty-five prisoners, before being killed himself by machine gun fire.

Born in a suburb of Newcastle, New South Wales, Jeffries was employed as a surveyor at a mining company where his father served as general manager. Joining a militia battalion in 1912, he was commissioned as a second lieutenant upon the outbreak of war and tasked with the instruction of volunteers for the newly raised Australian Imperial Force. Transferring into the Australian Imperial Force himself in 1916, Jeffries embarked with the 34th Battalion for service on the Western Front. Wounded at Messines, he was promoted to captain before being killed fourteen days short of his twenty-third birthday.

== Early life ==
Jeffries was born in the Newcastle suburb of Wallsend, New South Wales, on 26 October 1894. He was the only child of Joshua Jeffries, a colliery manager, and his wife Barbara, née Steel. Jeffries attended Dudley Primary School before moving onto Newcastle Collegiate and High schools. Apprenticed as a mining surveyor at the Abermain Collieries on the state's northern coalfields, where his father was general manager, Jeffries was noted as a cricketer and a keen horseman who took a particular interest in breeding thoroughbreds. In July 1912, Jeffries joined the 14th (Hunter River) Infantry Regiment, Citizen Military Forces, as a private under the compulsory training scheme. He was promoted to sergeant a year later.

== First World War ==
Following the outbreak of the First World War, Jeffries was commissioned as a second lieutenant in the Citizen Military Forces on 22 August 1914. By this time he was in charge of the survey department at the Abermain Collieries, but was mobilised for home defence duties and the instruction of volunteers for the newly raised Australian Imperial Force at Newcastle and Liverpool camps. Promoted lieutenant in the Citizen Military Forces in July 1915, he transferred to the Australian Imperial Force on 1 February 1916 with the substantive rank of second lieutenant, and was placed in command of C Company of the 34th Battalion. In May, the battalion embarked from Sydney for the United Kingdom, with Jeffries aboard HMAT Hororata. Arriving in late June, the battalion spent the next five months training in England, during which time Jeffries was promoted to lieutenant.

In late November 1916, the 34th Battalion was shipped to France for service on the Western Front. Initially posted to the Armentières sector in Belgium, the battalion did not participate in its first major battle until June 1917, when it took part in the Battle of Messines after the British and Dominion operations switched to the Ypres sector of Belgium. During the engagement, Jeffries received a bullet wound to the thigh while leading a reconnaissance patrol and was evacuated to the 3rd General Hospital in London. While recuperating, he was promoted to captain on 26 June, before rejoining his battalion in September as a company commander.

=== Victoria Cross ===
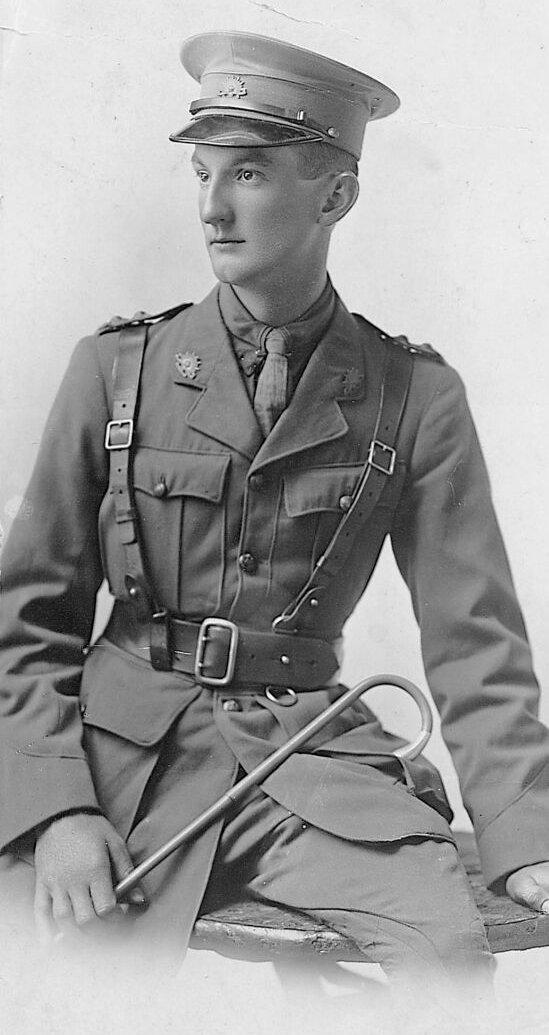
Lieutenant Clarence Jeffries in c. 1915

On 12 October 1917, the 34th Battalion—as a member of the 9th Brigade—was to take part in the 3rd Australian Division's attack on Passchendaele, Belgium. Subject to several days of heavy rain, the battlefield had been transformed into a boggy marsh on which the attack was to commence. Jeffries commanded B Company during the attack, which he halted at the entrance to Broodseinde railway cutting, as many of the direction tapes leading to the starting position had been destroyed or swallowed up by the mud. To avoid any mishaps, Jeffries and another of the battalion's company commanders, Captain T.G. Gilder, pushed on alone as far as Keerselaarhoek cemetery to find the tapes marking the battalions starting line for the attack. Thus, by 03:00 the 34th Battalion was formed up on the line of attack.

At the designated time of 05:25, the British opened up with an artillery barrage on the German positions just as the Australian forces entered no man's land for the attack. Heavy machine gun fire assaulted the troops from all directions as they bunched together on the firmer ground to avoid sinking in the boggy mud. Serious resistance was encountered at Hilside Farm, a strong point to the east of Augustus Wood in the centre of the highest part of the Passchendaele ridge. The position consisted of two pillboxes, supported by fifty metres of trench that was occupied by approximately thirty men with four machine guns. The fire from these machine guns forced the men of the 34th Battalion to seek cover on the exposed crest and threatened to halt the entire advance.

Jeffries, realising his force was suffering heavy casualties, quickly organised a bombing party of fourteen men and set about outflanking the pillboxes. Accompanying Jeffries was Sergeant James Bruce, a 39-year-old Scottish-born miner who had worked for Jeffries' father at the Abermain Collieries. According to popular legend, Bruce had promised to look out for his boss's son, and remained at Jeffries' side throughout the attack. Working around the position, the party attacked the emplacement from the rear, capturing four machine guns and thirty-five prisoners; thus reviving the advance. Jeffries then led his company forward under heavy artillery and machine gun fire to reach their first objective.

Despite the heavy losses which left gaping holes in the Allied line, it was decided that the next stage of the advance was to go ahead. At 08:25, parties from the 34th and 35th Battalions headed out along the south-eastern edge of the ridge towards the outskirts of Passchendaele. Almost immediately, they came under heavy fire from a pillbox close by a railway embankment, at which time Major J.B. Buchanan, the senior brigade officer with the advance party, fell dead, leaving Jeffries to assume control. Gathering a party of eleven men, he set about silencing the machine gun position. Edging across the open ground, the party attacked the position from the west just as the machine gun was firing to the north. Realising that an attack was imminent, the machine gunner switched around, mortally wounding Jeffries in the stomach and sending the rest of the party to ground. When its fire eased, the remaining members of the group worked around the position, rushed it and seized two machine guns in conjunction with thirty prisoners.

With the second objective only partially captured, the remnants of the 9th Brigade, battered by artillery and machine gun fire, were forced to relinquish their position and retreat back to their own lines. All that remained on the Passchendaele ridge of the 9th Brigade was the dead and wounded, among whom was Clarence Jeffries, who was later counted among those with no known grave.

== Legacy ==
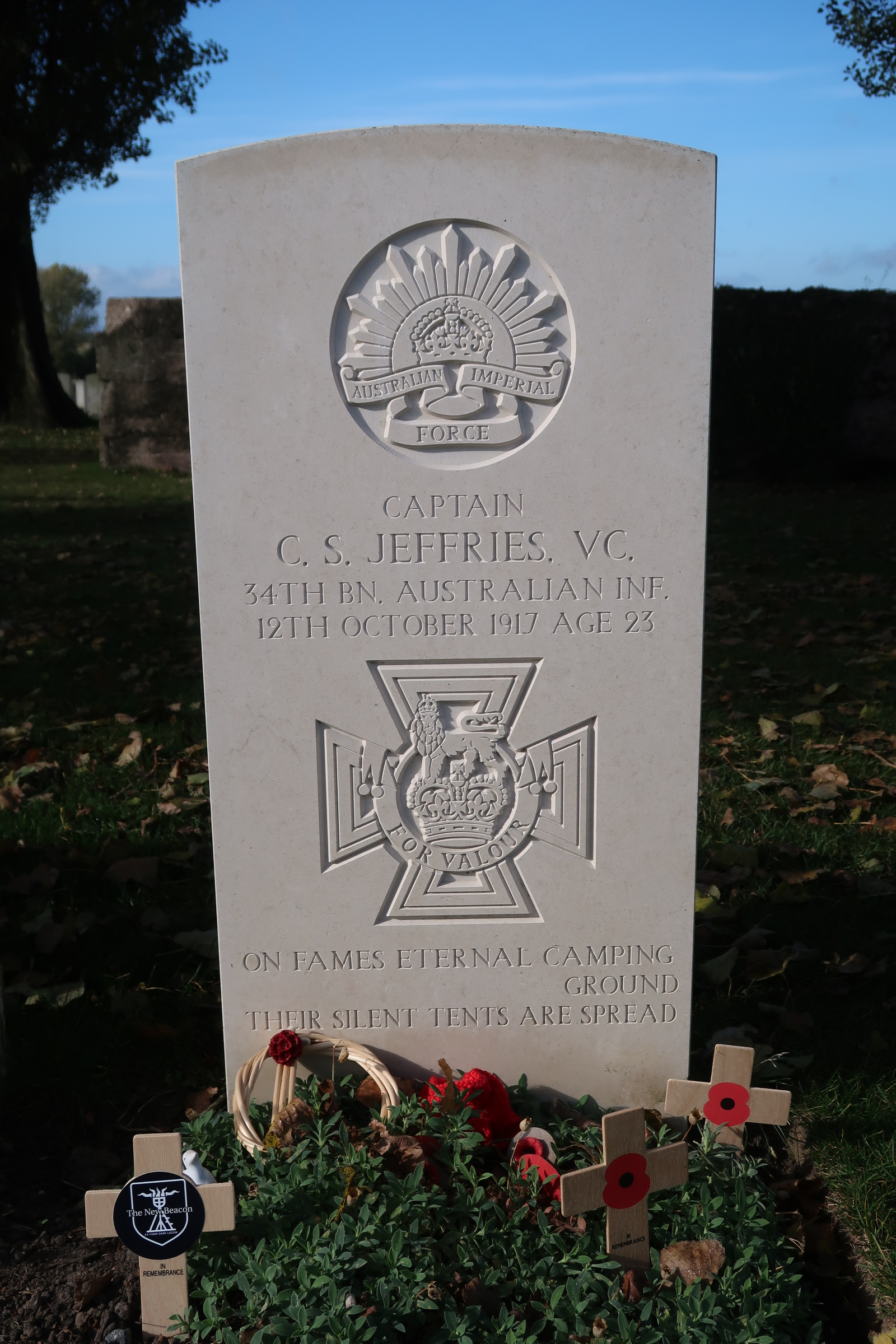
Jeffries' grave in Tyne Cot Cemetery

For his actions during the battle at Passchendaele, Jeffries was awarded a posthumous Victoria Cross, the notification of which was published in the London Gazette on 18 December 1917. His citation read:

War Office, 18th December, 1917

His Majesty the KING has been graciously pleased to approve of the award of the Victoria Cross to the undermentioned Officers, Noncommissioned Officers and Man:—

Capt. Clarence Smith Jeffries, late Australian Imperial Force.

For most conspicuous bravery in attack, when his company was held up by enemy machine-gun fire from concrete emplacements. Organising a party, he rushed one emplacement, capturing four machine guns and thirty-five prisoners. He then led his company forward under extremely heavy enemy artillery barrage and enfilade machine-gun fire to the objective.

Later, he again organised a successful attack on a machine-gun emplacement, capturing two machine guns and thirty more prisoners.

This gallant officer was killed during the attack, but it was entirely due to his bravery and initiative that the centre of the attack was not held up for a lengthy period. His example had a most inspiring influence.

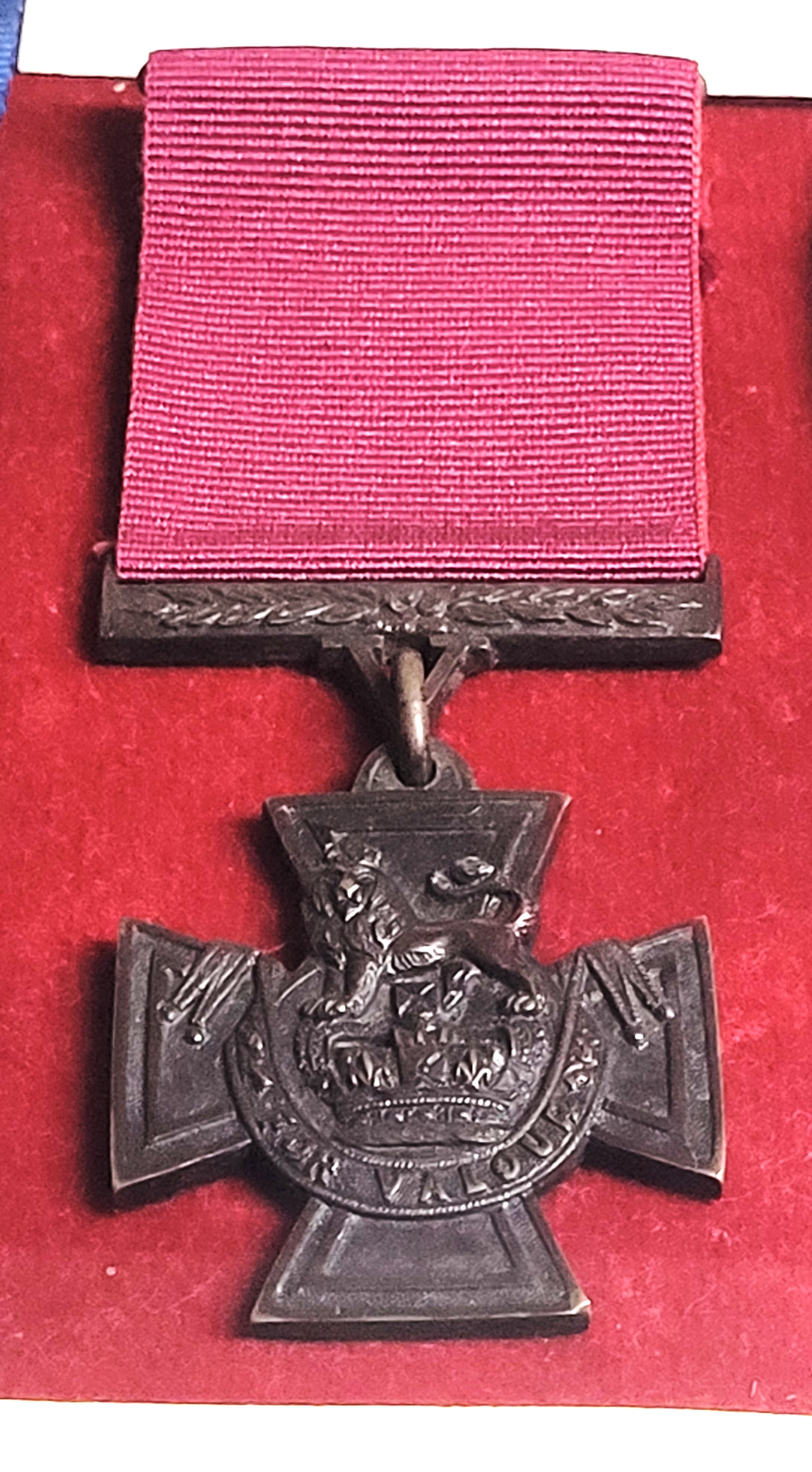
Jeffries' Victoria Cross at Christchurch Cathedral, Newcastle

Severely affected by the unknown fate of his son's body, Joshua Jeffries set out for Belgium in 1920 in an attempt to discover his son's "lost grave". He returned to Australia disappointed, only to learn in January 1921 that Clarence's body had been exhumed from a battlefield grave on 14 September 1920, and re-buried in Tyne Cot Cemetery, Plot XL, Row E, Grave 1. The body had been identified by a set of captain's pips, Australian numerals and the penciled initials "C.S.J." found on the ground sheet in which the body was wrapped. Three years later, Joshua Jeffries returned to Belgium once again; this time to pay his last respects to his son. As a debt of gratitude to the late Lieutenant James Bruce, MC, DCM, who as a sergeant had assisted Clarence at Passchendaele before being killed himself on 17 July 1918, Joshua employed Bruce's two eldest sons as trainee mining surveyors at the Abermain Collieries.

Following a campaign by the citizens of Abermain, the Capt. Clarence Smith Jeffries Memorial Park was established in 1947, and upon Barbara Jeffries death in 1964, she bequeathed her son's medals to the Warriors Chapel at Christchurch Cathedral, Newcastle, New South Wales where they are currently on display.

Jeffries is also commemorated by photographic portraits in the Abermain Memorial and Citizens' Club and by a carved chair presented to Abermain Holy Trinity Anglican Church by his uncle and aunt in 1918. In 1976, the Jeffries and Currey Memorial Library was opened by the Governor of New South Wales, Sir Roden Cutler, at Dudley Public School to honour two of the school's pupils who were decorated with the Victoria Cross during the First World War: Clarence Jeffries and William Currey. The pair are also commemorated by the Capt. Clarence Smith Jeffries (V.C.) and Pte. William Matthew Currey (V.C.) Memorial Wall located in the grounds of Sandgate General Cemetery, Newcastle, which was unveiled in an official ceremony on 16 April 2000. The Clarence Jeffries Housing Estate at Bullecourt Army Barracks in Adamstown is also named in his honour.
