= 34th Battalion (Australia) =

Australian Army infantry battalion

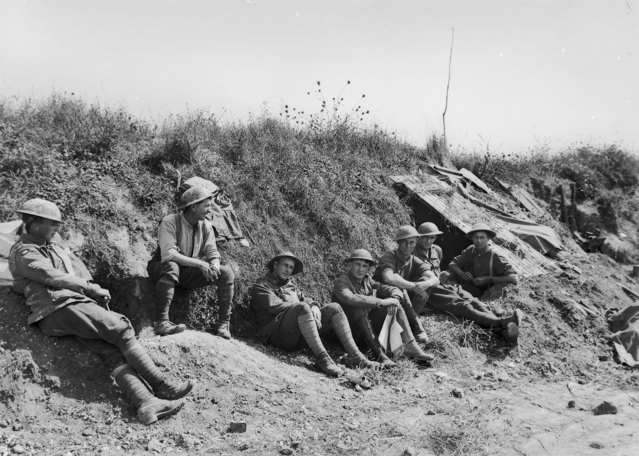
- Troops from the 34th Battalion at Picardie, 21 August 1918
- Active: 1916–1919; 1921–1943; 1951–1960
- Country: Australia
- Branch: Australian Army
- Type: Infantry
- Size: ~ 900–1,000 personnel
- Part of: 9th Brigade, 3rd Division
- Nicknames: Maitland Own and Illawarra Regiment in 1919 after it was re-raised.
- Colours: Purple and green
- March: Blaze Away
- Engagements: World War I: Western Front; World War II

Insignia
- Unit colour patch

The 34th Battalion was an infantry unit of 1st Australian Imperial Force (AIF), which was established in World War I for overseas service. Formed in Australia in 1916, the battalion fought on the Western Front before being disbanded in 1919. It was later re-raised as a part-time infantry battalion in the Illawarra region of New South Wales during the inter-war years. During World War II, the 34th was amalgamated with the 20th Battalion and undertook defensive duties in Australia before being disbanded in 1944. Post war, the 34th was re-formed in the early 1950s before being subsumed into the Royal New South Wales Regiment in 1960.

== History ==
=== World War I ===
The battalion was formed in January 1916 during an expansion of the AIF that took place after the Gallipoli campaign. Assigned to the 9th Brigade of the Australian 3rd Division, the majority of the battalion's personnel were volunteers that came from Maitland, New South Wales – many of whom had been coal miners – and as a result the unit became known as "Maitland's Own". Its initial recruits, though, came from north-west New South Wales, having marched from Walgett. After initial training, the 34th Battalion, with an authorised strength of 1,023 men, embarked in Sydney and sailed to Europe where the 3rd Division concentrated in the United Kingdom to undertake further training prior to joining the other four divisions of the AIF that had been transferred from Egypt in mid-1916.

After five months of training on Salisbury Plain, the battalion arrived in France in November 1916, as the 3rd Division was transferred to the front over the course of several months. The division's move was not complete until February 1917, but the battalion was moved up to the front line soon after its arrival, taking up a position on 27 November 1916. Over Christmas, the Australians endured the worst winter Europe experienced in 40 years, and for the next two years the 34th Battalion served on the Western Front until the end of the war.

Nevertheless, the battalion's first major action did not come until mid-1917 when the British shifted their focus towards the Ypres sector in Belgium and the 3rd Division was committed to the Battle of Messines as part of II Anzac Corps on 7 June. The 34th Battalion, along with the rest of the 9th Brigade, was tasked with leading the division's assault. Beginning their approach march late on 6 June, they were caught in a German gas bombardment that inflicted heavy casualties; nevertheless, they arrived at the line of departure on time and, after a number of mines were exploded in front of their positions, the assault began. The exploding mines destroyed a large part of the German line and as a result initial resistance was quickly overcome. By 5 am on 7 June, the division had gained the crest of the Messines Ridge and dug-in to defend against a possible counter-attack, with the 34th occupying a position around Grey Farm.

Following Messines, the 34th was rotated between manning the front line and conducting training in rear areas, before joining the Battle of Passchendaele on 12 October. Despite beginning promisingly for the Allies, by the time the 34th arrived heavy rain had turned the battlefield into a muddy quagmire that hindered their advance and ultimately resulted in heavy casualties and limited gains; for the 34th the losses were particularly heavy, representing 50 per cent of its strength. Following Passchendaele, a reduced tempo period followed as the battalion was reformed throughout the remainder of 1917. In between resting, training and rotating through the front line, the 34th was used as labour in the rear areas as it was built back up to strength.

In early 1918, after the collapse of the Russian Empire and the signing of the Treaty of Brest-Litovsk allowed the Germans to concentrate their forces in the west, the Germans launched a major offensive on the Western Front. Striking significant blows against the British southern flank, the Germans pushed the Allies back towards the vital Amiens railhead. As the situation became desperate for the Allies, the 9th Brigade was thrown into the line around Villers-Bretonneux to stop the Germans from splitting the British Fifth Army and the French First Army to their south. The 34th Battalion subsequently took part in heavy fighting when the Australians counter-attacked at Hangard Wood on 30 March, before finally turning back the German attack on Villers-Bretonneux on 4 April. A peaceful penetration action was fought around Morlancourt by the 9th Brigade in early May 1918.

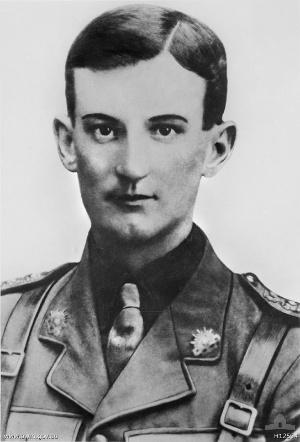
Clarence Jeffries, the 34th Battalion's sole Victoria Cross recipient

After blunting the German offensive, in August the Allies launched the Hundred Days Offensive, which ultimately ended the war, around Amiens. After joining the attack on 8 August, the 34th participated in the series of advances that followed. Its final action came around the St Quentin Canal in late September. The involvement of the Australian Corps in the earlier actions in 1918 had significantly depleted its battalions which had suffered heavy casualties that they had been unable to replace as the number of volunteers arriving from Australia had fallen. As a result, upon Australian Prime Minister Billy Hughes' request, it was subsequently withdrawn from the line for reorganisation and rest in October. It remained out of the line until the armistice came into effect in November. With the end of hostilities, the Australian units began to demobilise and their personnel were slowly repatriated back to Australia. As its numbers dwindled, the 34th Battalion was disbanded in May 1919.

During the war, 481 men from the battalion were killed and 1,727 were wounded or gassed. Members of the 34th received the following decorations: one Victoria Cross, three Distinguished Service Orders, one Officer of the Order of the British Empire, two Members of the Order of the British Empire, 10 Distinguished Conduct Medals, 21 Military Crosses (including one Bar), 77 Military Medals (including three Bars), five Meritorious Service Medals, 31 Mentions in Despatches and seven "foreign" awards. Captain Clarence Jeffries was the battalion's sole VC recipient, receiving the award for actions during the First Battle of Passchendaele in 1917. A total of 14 battle honours were awarded to the battalion for the war.

=== Inter-war years and subsequent service ===
In 1921, during a re-organisation of Australia's part-time military forces – the Citizen Forces – designed to perpetuate the units of the AIF, the battalion was re-raised as an infantry battalion in New South Wales. In doing so, the battalion drew personnel from the 2nd Battalion, 34th Infantry Regiment, which drew its lineage from the 37th Infantry Regiment. In 1927, when territorial designations were introduced, the battalion adopted the title of the "Illawarra Regiment" and the motto Malo Mori Quam Foedari. In 1936, the battalion formed an alliance with The Border Regiment. Initially, a mixture of voluntary and compulsory service was used to maintain the strength of the Citizen Forces units; however, in 1930, the newly elected Scullin Labor government abolished the Universal Training Scheme, replacing it with a volunteer-only Militia.

During World War II, due to the provisions of the Defence Act, which precluded Militia units from being sent outside Australian territory to fight, the battalion remained in Australia where it undertook defensive duties variously assigned to the 14th and 28th Brigades. Around November 1942, the battalion's machine gun company was detached and in conjunction with several other Militia machine gun companies, it was used to form the 6th Machine Gun Battalion. On 2 December 1943, the battalion was amalgamated with the 20th Battalion to form the 20th/34th Battalion; this unit was itself disbanded on 6 April 1944 without having been deployed overseas.

After the war, Australia's part-time military force was re-organised in 1948 under the guise of the Citizen Military Force (CMF); however, the 34th Battalion was not re-raised until 29 October 1951. In 1953, the battalion adopted the regimental march Blaze Away and formed an alliance with the King's Own Scottish Borderers. On 8 March 1959, the battalion was granted the Freedom of the City of Wollongong, but the following year it ceased to exist when the Pentropic divisional establishment was adopted by the Australian Army, the infantry units of the CMF were re-organised into state-based regiments with former battalion-level organisations becoming company-level formations of Pentropic battalions. At this time, the 34th Battalion became part of the 3rd Battalion, Royal New South Wales Regiment, forming that unit's 'B' Company.

== Alliances ==
The 34th Battalion held the following alliances:

- United Kingdom – The Border Regiment: 1936–51;
- United Kingdom – The Kings Own Scottish Borderers: 1953–59;
- United Kingdom – The Border Regiment: 1955–59
- United Kingdom – The Kings Own Royal Border Regiment: 1959–60.

== Battle honours ==
The 34th Battalion received the following battle honours:

- World War I: Messines 1917, Ypres 1917, Polygon Wood, Broodseinde, Poelcappelle, Passchendaele, Somme 1918, Ancre 1918, Amiens, Albert 1918, Mont St Quentin, Hindenburg Line, St Quentin Canal, France and Flanders 1916–18.

== Commanding officers ==
The following officers served as commanding officer of the 34th Battalion during World War I:

- Lamb, Malcolm St John;
- Martin, Ernest Edward;
- Grant, Francis George;
- Woolcock, Arthur Raff.
