= Tyne Cot =

WWI CWGC cemetery near Passendale, Belgium

- Commonwealth War Graves Commission
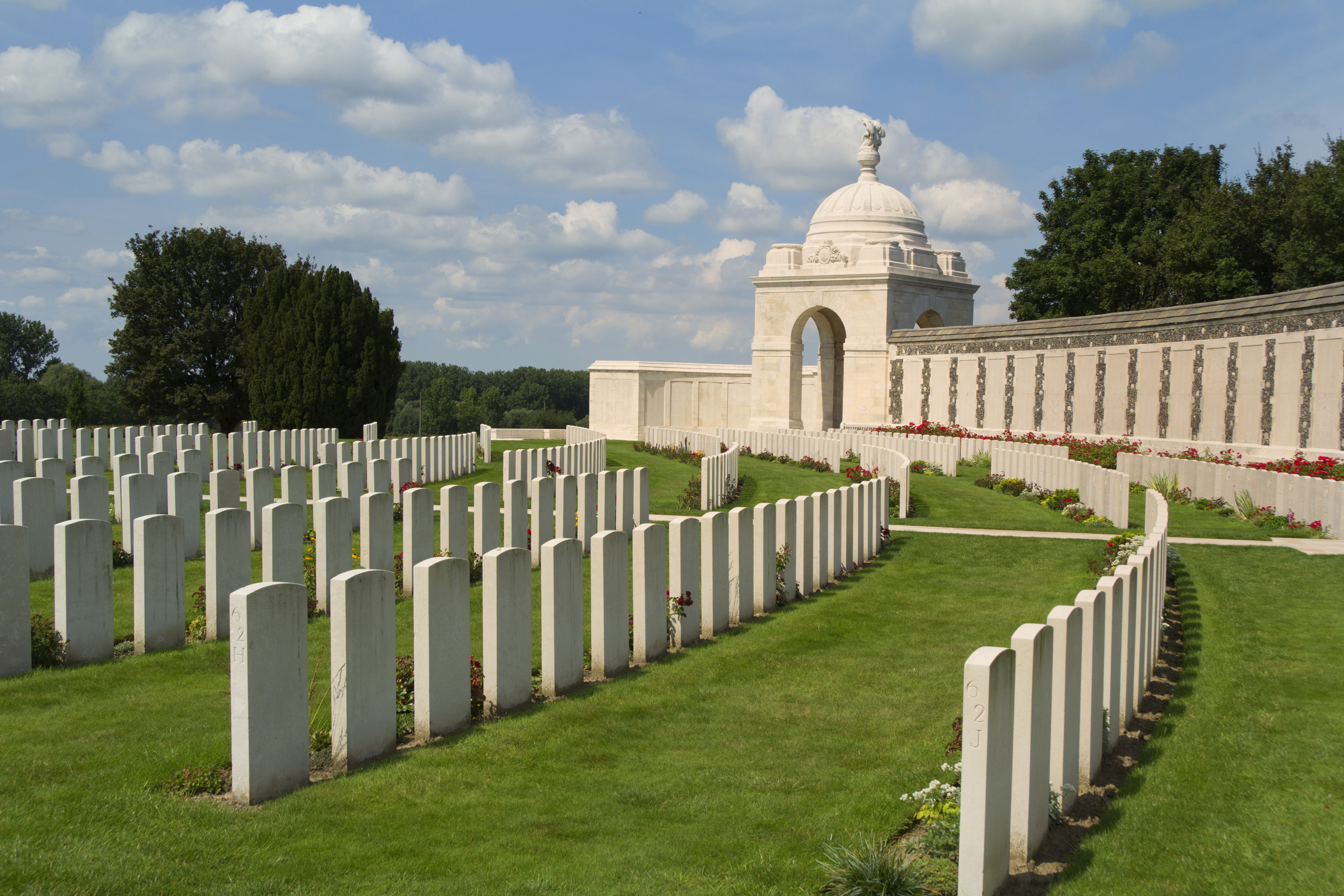
- Used for those deceased 1917–1918
- Established: October 1917
- Location: 50°53′13″N 02°59′53″E near Passendale, West Flanders, Belgium
- Designed by: Sir Herbert Baker
- Total burials: 11,965, of which 8,369 are unnamed
- Unknowns: 101

Burials by nation
- Allied Powers: United Kingdom: 8,907; Canada: 966; Newfoundland: 14; Australia: 1,353; New Zealand: 519; South Africa: 90; British West Indies: 2; France: 1; Central Powers: Germany: 4

Burials by war
- World War I: 11,954
- 1914 – Here are recorded the names of officers and men of the armies of the British Empire who fell in Ypres Salient, but to whom the fortune of war denied the known and honoured burial given to their comrades in death – 1918

UNESCO World Heritage Site
- Official name: Funerary and memory sites of the First World War (Western Front)
- Type: Cultural
- Criteria: i, ii, vi
- Designated: 2023 (45th session)
- Reference no.: 1567-FL08

Tyne Cot Commonwealth War Graves Cemetery and Memorial to the Missing is a Commonwealth War Graves Commission (CWGC) burial ground for the dead of World War I in the Ypres Salient on the Western Front. It is the largest cemetery for Commonwealth forces in the world, for any war. The cemetery and its surrounding memorial are located outside Passendale, near Zonnebeke in Belgium.

== Name ==
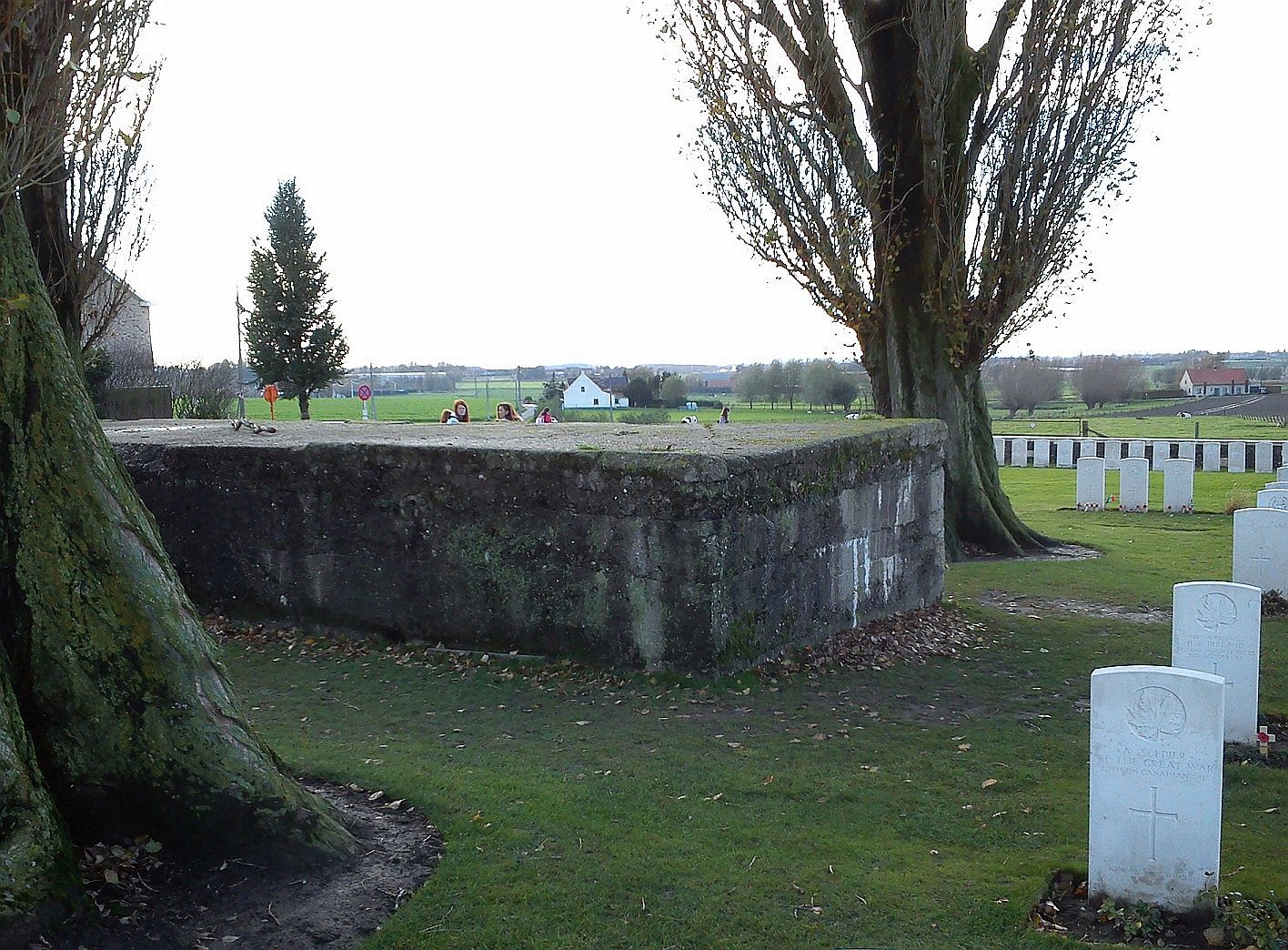
Pill box of Flandern I Stellung in the grounds of Tyne Cot

The name "Tyne Cot" is said to come from the Northumberland Fusiliers, seeing a resemblance between the many German concrete pill boxes on this site and typical Tyneside workers' cottages (Tyne cots). Tyne Cot CWGC Cemetery lies on a broad rise in the landscape which overlooks the surrounding countryside. As such, the location was strategically important to both sides fighting in the area. The concrete shelters which still stand in various parts of the cemetery were part of a fortified position of the German Flandern I Stellung, which played an important tactical role during the Battle of Passchendaele in 1917.

== Tyne Cot Commonwealth War Graves Cemetery ==
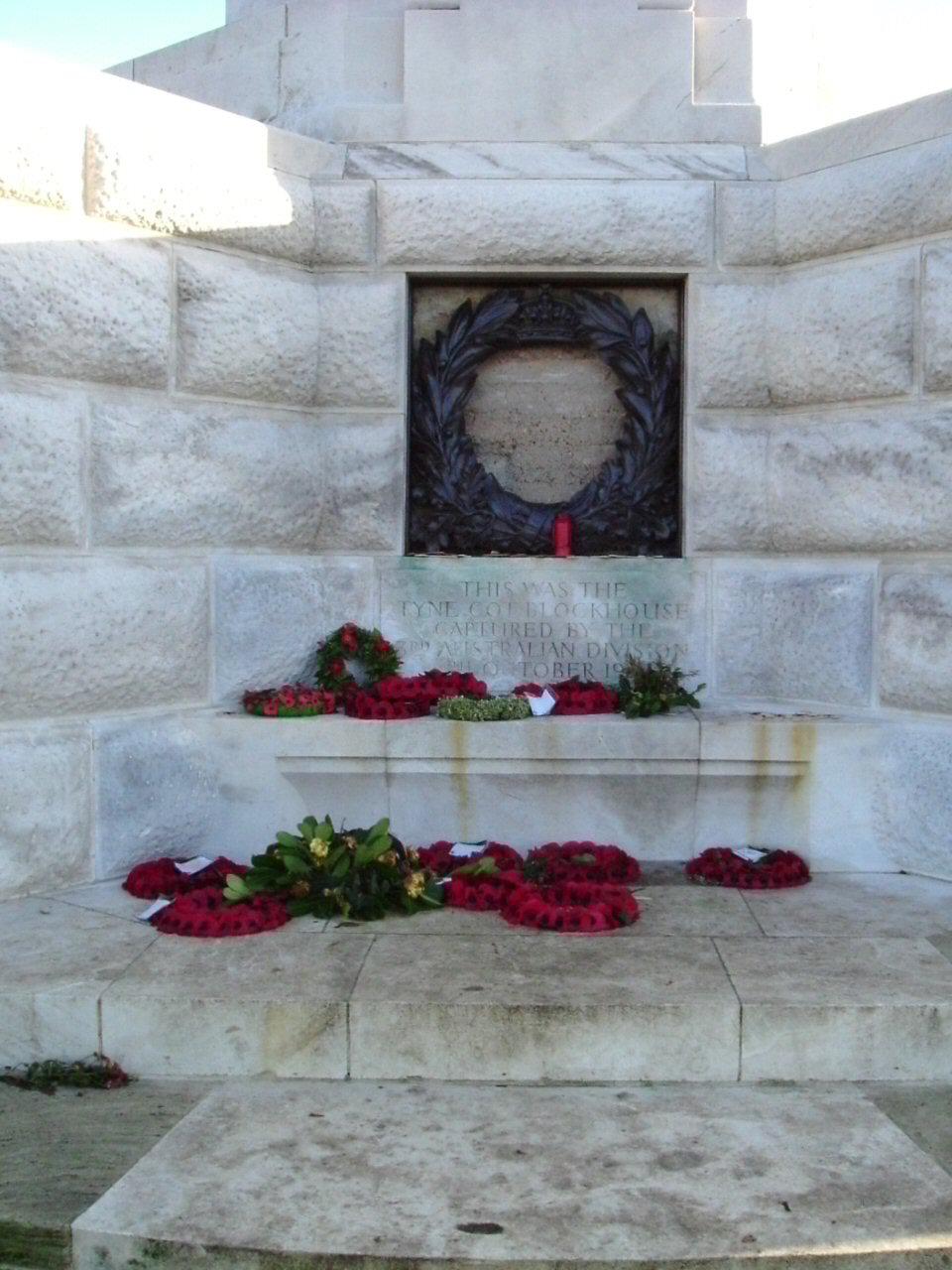
The inscription on the cross built upon the largest of the three pillboxes reads: THIS WAS THE TYNE COT BLOCKHOUSE CAPTURED BY THE 3RD AUSTRALIAN DIVISION 4 October 1917 It originally read "2nd Division" until corrected in the 1990s.

On 4 October 1917, the area where Tyne Cot CWGC Cemetery is now located was captured by the 3rd Australian Division and the New Zealand Division and two days later a cemetery for British and Canadian war dead was begun. The cemetery was recaptured by German forces on 13 April 1918 and was finally liberated by Belgian forces on 28 September.

After the Armistice in November 1918, the cemetery was greatly enlarged from its original 343 graves by concentrating graves from the battlefields, smaller cemeteries nearby and from Langemark.

The cemetery grounds were assigned to the United Kingdom in perpetuity by King Albert I of Belgium in recognition of the sacrifices made by the British Empire in the defence and liberation of Belgium during the war. The cemetery was designed by Sir Herbert Baker.

The Cross of Sacrifice that marks many CWGC cemeteries was built on top of a German pillbox in the centre of the cemetery, purportedly at the suggestion of King George V, who visited the cemetery in 1922 as it neared completion. The King's visit, described in the poem The King's Pilgrimage, included a speech in which he said:

We can truly say that the whole circuit of the Earth is girdled with the graves of our dead. In the course of my pilgrimage, I have many times asked myself whether there can be more potent advocates of peace upon Earth through the years to come, than this massed multitude of silent witnesses to the desolation of war.

— King George V, 11 May 1922

=== Notable graves ===
The cemetery has several notable graves and memorials, including the grave of Private James Peter Robertson (1883–1917), a Canadian awarded the Victoria Cross for bravery in rushing a machine gun emplacement and rescuing two men from under heavy fire. He was killed saving the second of these men on 6 November 1917.

Two Australian recipients of the Victoria Cross buried in the cemetery are Captain Clarence Smith Jeffries (1894–1917), and Sergeant Lewis McGee (1888–1917). Jeffries led an assault party and rushed one of the strong points at the First Battle of Passchendaele on 12 October 1917, capturing four machine guns and thirty five prisoners, before running his company forward again. He was planning another attack when he was killed by an enemy gunner. On the same day, McGee, who had earned his decoration eight days earlier at Broodseinde, was killed charging an enemy pillbox in the same battle.

Also at Tyne Cot, behind the Cross of Sacrifice which was constructed on top of an old German pillbox in the middle of the cemetery, there are 4 German graves, buried alongside Commonwealth graves. These graves are of men that were treated here after the battle, when the pillbox underneath the main cross was used as a dressing station for wounded men.

== Tyne Cot Memorial to the Missing ==
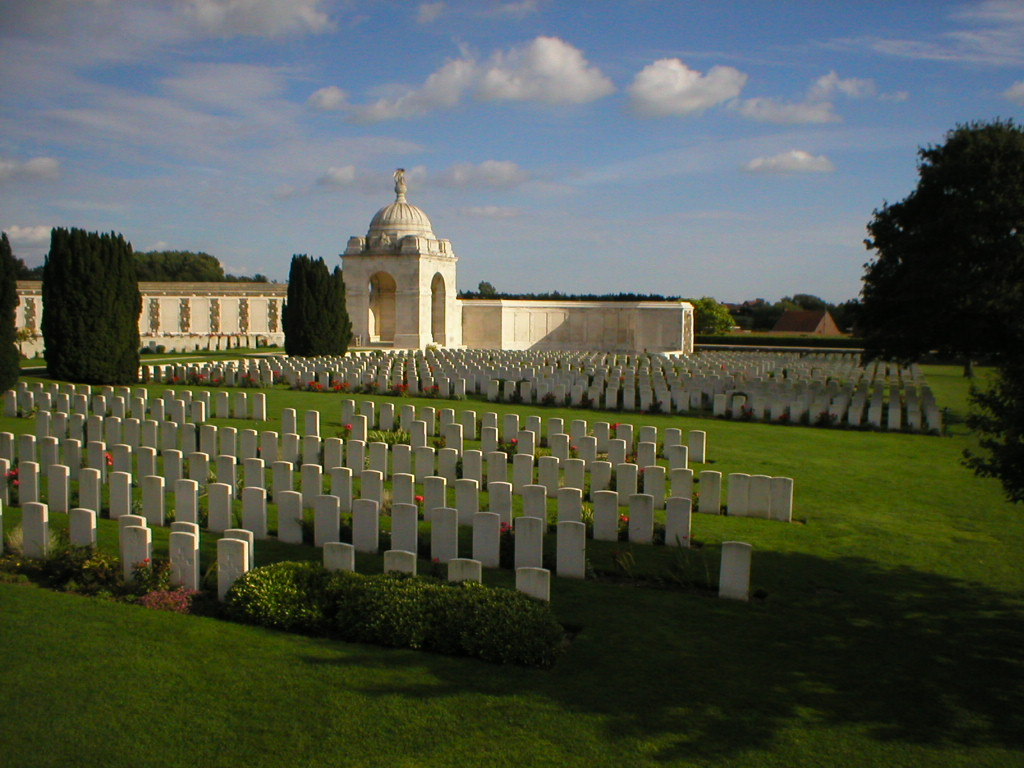
The walls forming the memorial in the background, with one of the rotundas

The stone wall surrounding the cemetery makes-up the Tyne Cot Memorial to the Missing, one of several Commonwealth War Graves Commission Memorials to the Missing along the Western Front. The UK missing lost in the Ypres Salient are commemorated at the Menin Gate memorial to the missing in Ypres and the Tyne Cot Memorial. Upon completion of the Menin Gate, builders discovered it was not large enough to contain all the names as originally planned. They selected an arbitrary cut-off date of 15 August 1917 and the names of the UK missing after this date were inscribed on the Tyne Cot memorial instead. Additionally, the New Zealand contingent of the Commonwealth War Graves Commission declined to have its missing soldiers names listed on the main memorials, choosing instead to have names listed on its own memorials near the appropriate battles. Tyne Cot was chosen as one of these locations. Unlike the other New Zealand memorials to its missing, the Tyne Cot New Zealand memorial to the missing is integrated within the larger Tyne Cot memorial, forming a central apse in the main memorial wall. The inscription reads: "Here are recorded the names of officers and men of New Zealand who fell in the Battle of Broodseinde and the First Battle of Passchendaele October 1917 and whose graves are known only unto God".

The memorial contains the names of 33,783 soldiers of the UK forces, plus a further 1,176 New Zealanders. Three British Army Victoria Cross recipients are commemorated here:

- Lieutenant Colonel Philip Bent (1891–1917)
- Corporal William Clamp (1891–1917)
- Lance Corporal Ernest Seaman (1893–1918)

Other notable persons commemorated include:

- Lieutenant Allan Ivo Steel, English first-class cricketer.
- Lieutenant David (Dai) Westacott, Welsh rugby international.
- Lieutenant Denis Bertram Sydney Buxton, son of Sydney Buxton, 1st Earl Buxton, a radical Liberal Party (UK) politician and Governor-General of South Africa.

It was designed by Sir Herbert Baker, with sculptures by Joseph Armitage and Ferdinand Victor Blundstone, who also sculpted part of the Newfoundland National War Memorial.

The memorial was unveiled on 20 June 1927 by Sir Gilbert Dyett.

== Gallery ==
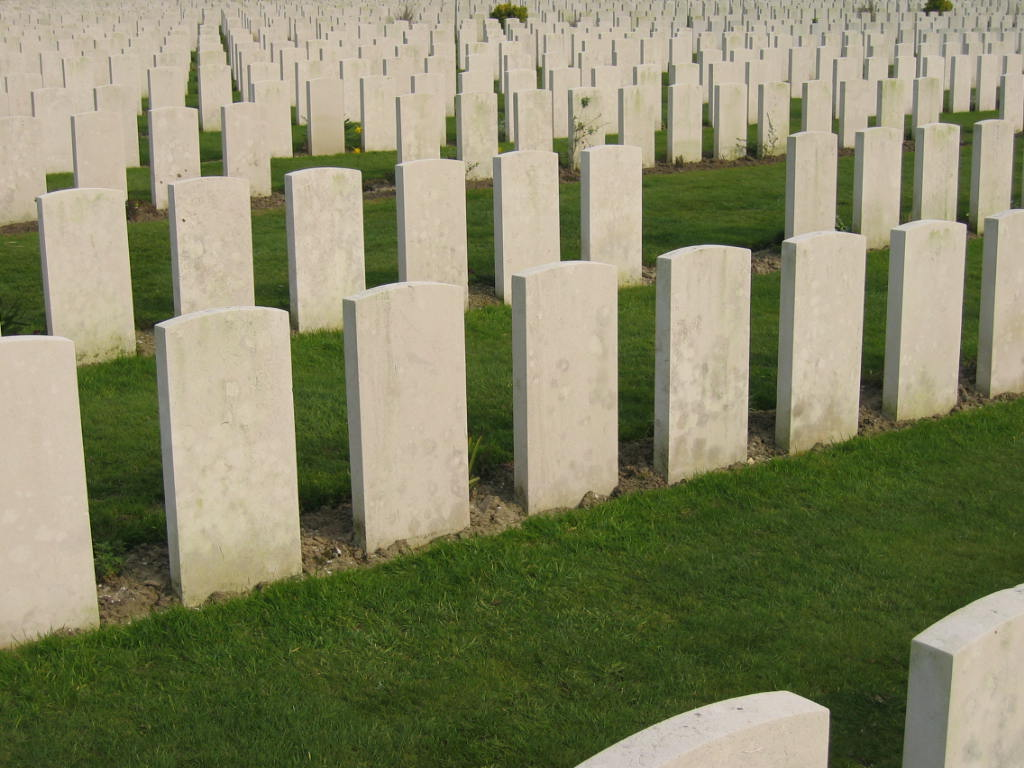
Graves at Tyne Cot Cemetery

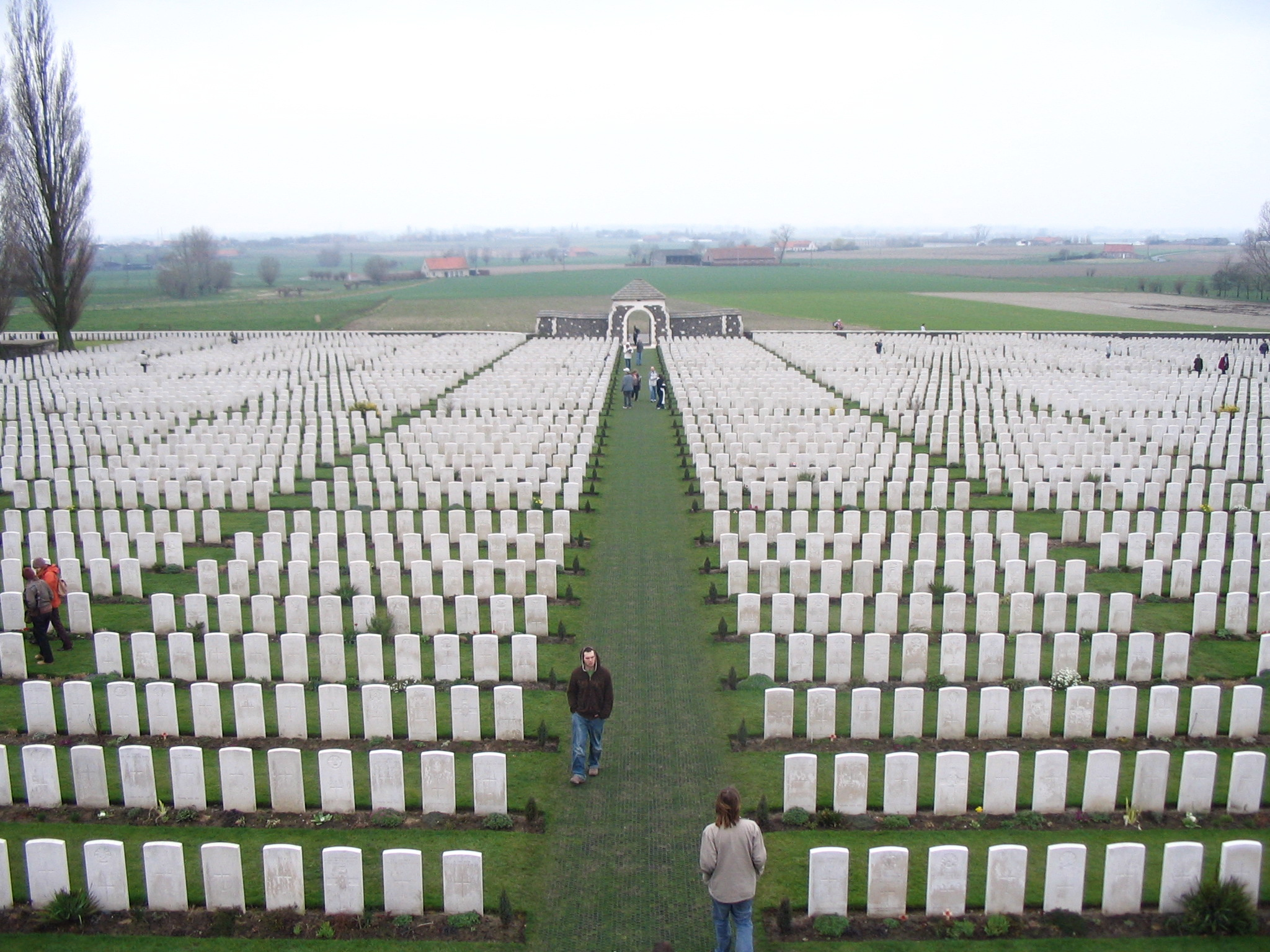
View towards entrance of cemetery

Tyne Cot Cemetery with "Cross of Sacrifice" on the far right

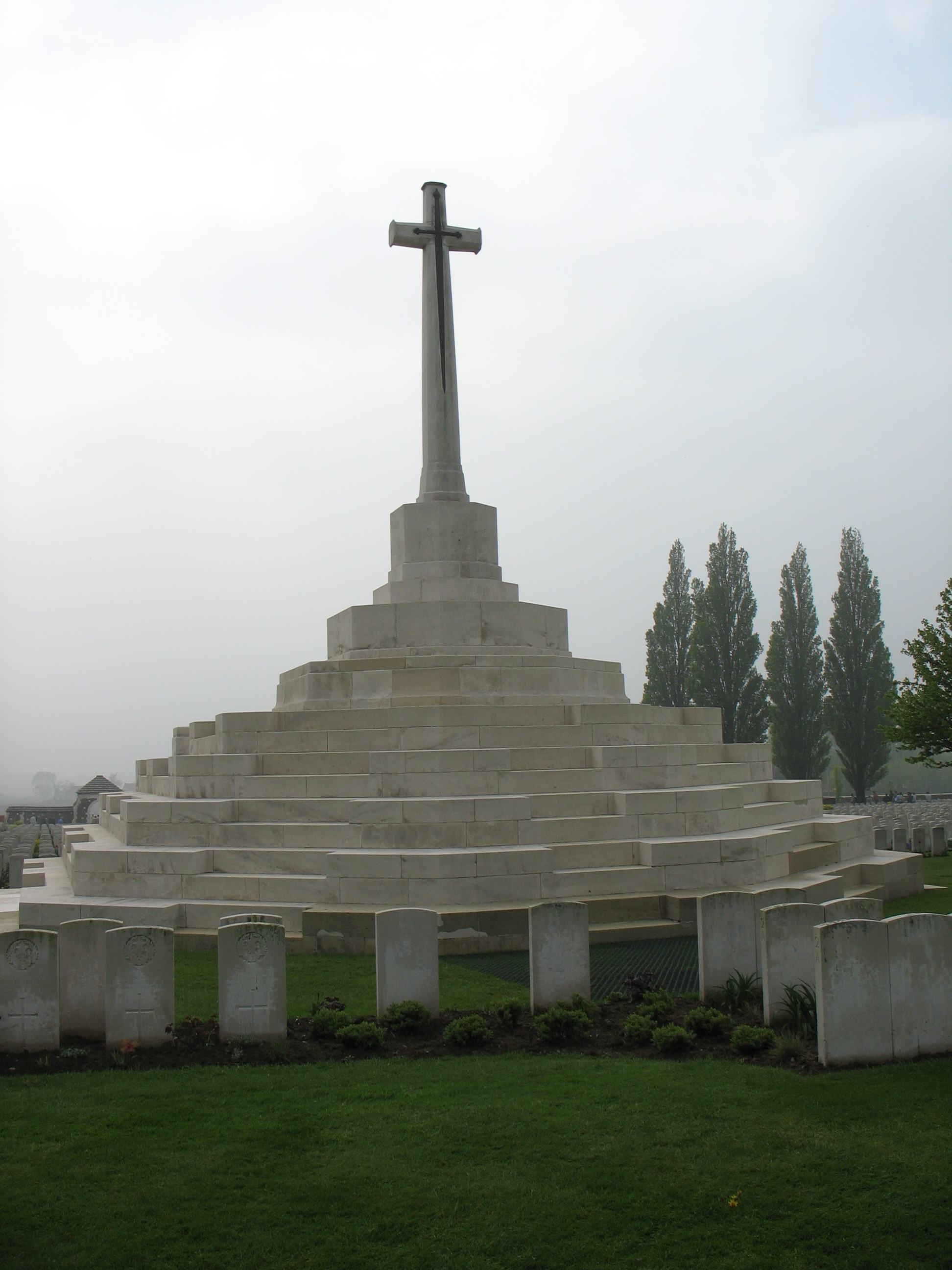
Tyne Cot "Cross of Sacrifice"

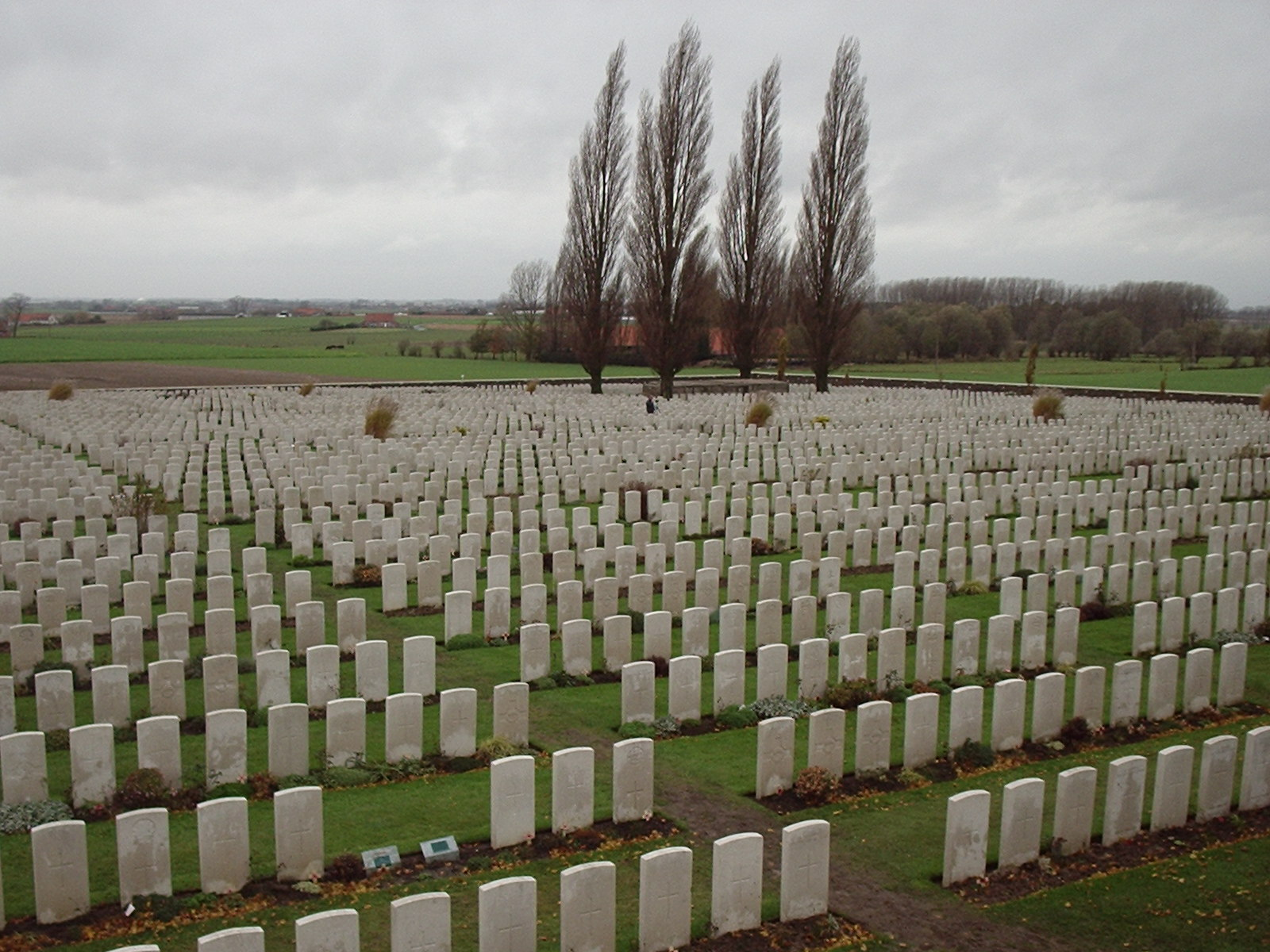

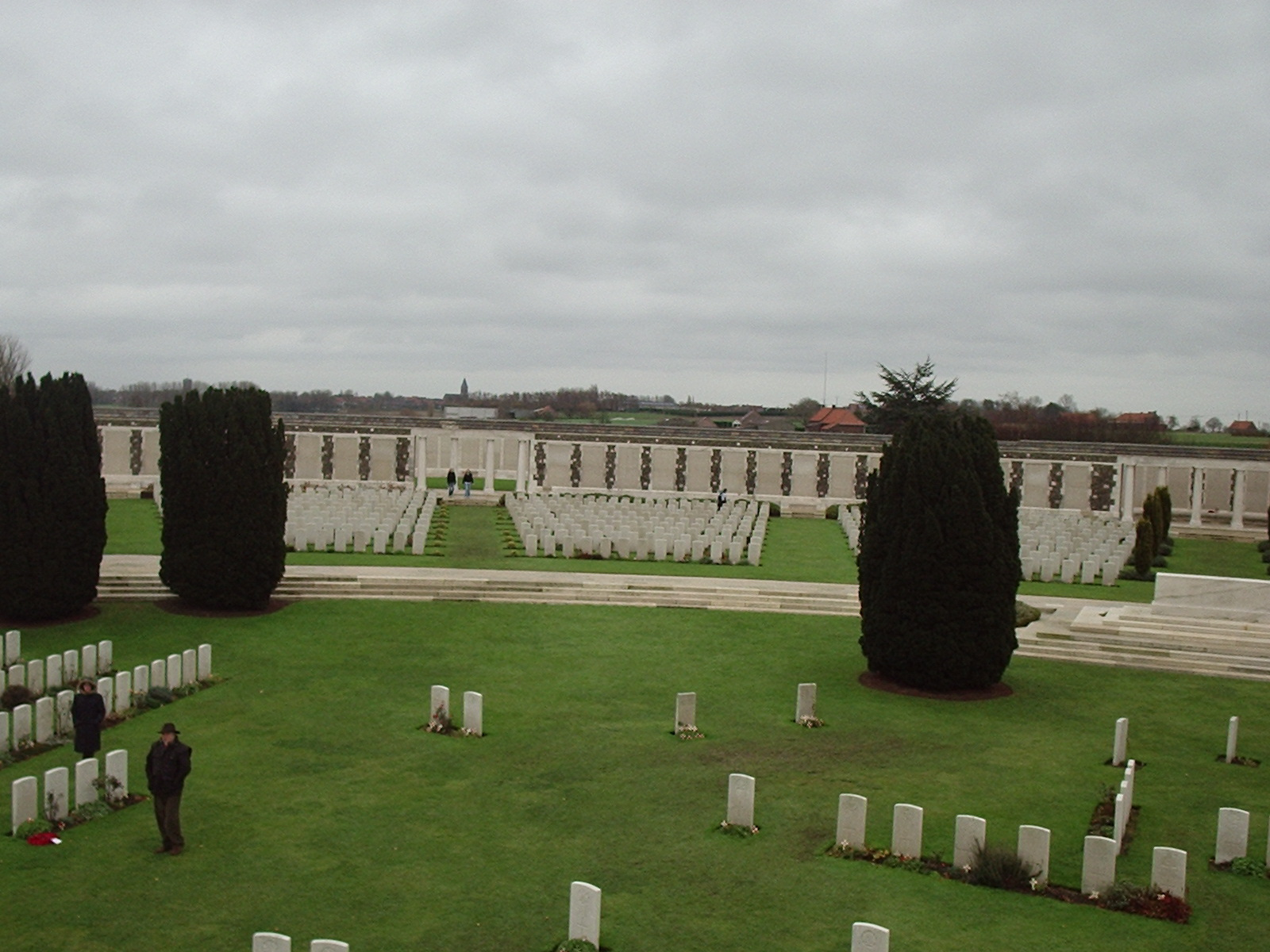

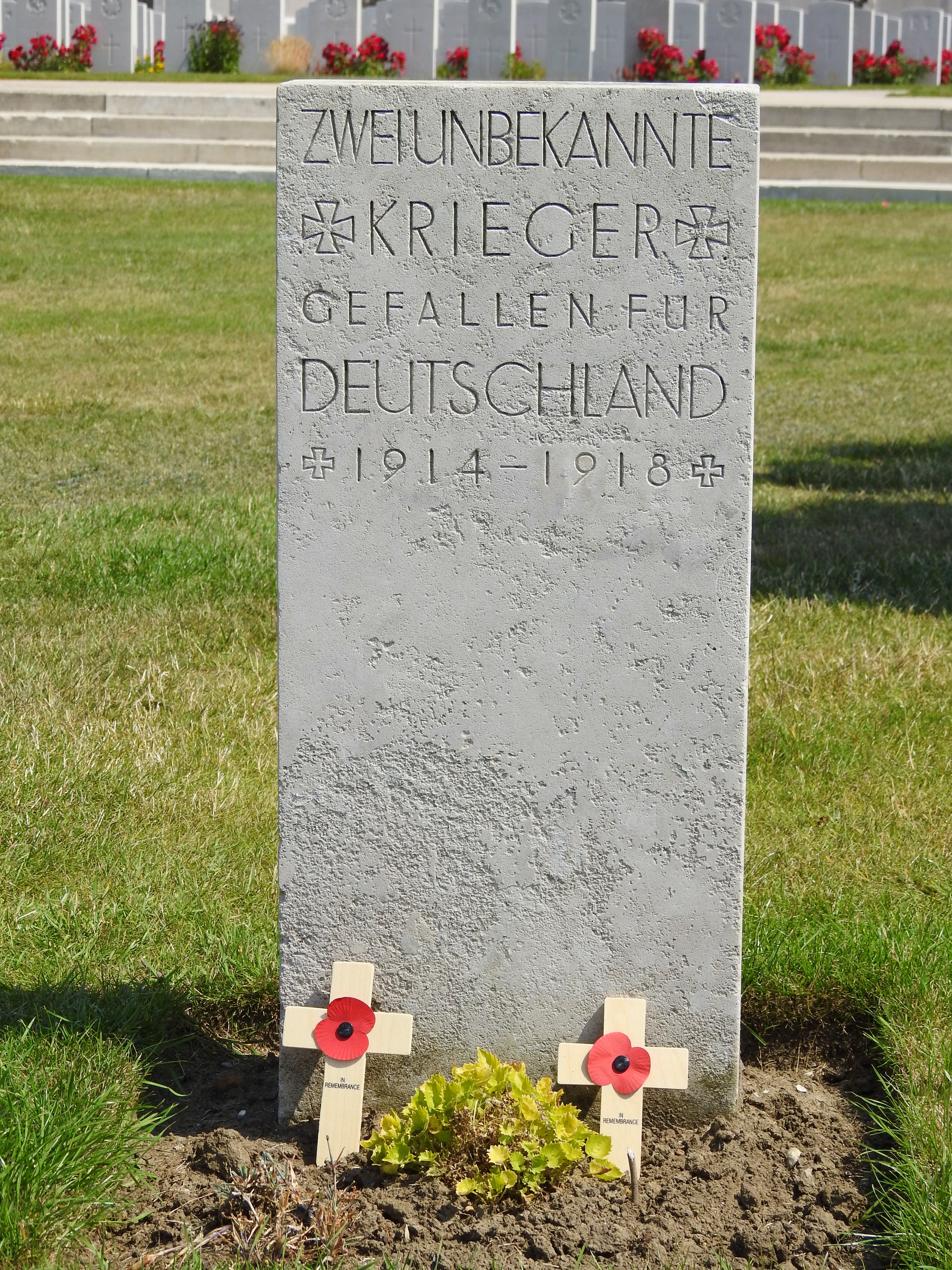
A single marker for two of the four German graves at Tyne Cot. Both are unknown.

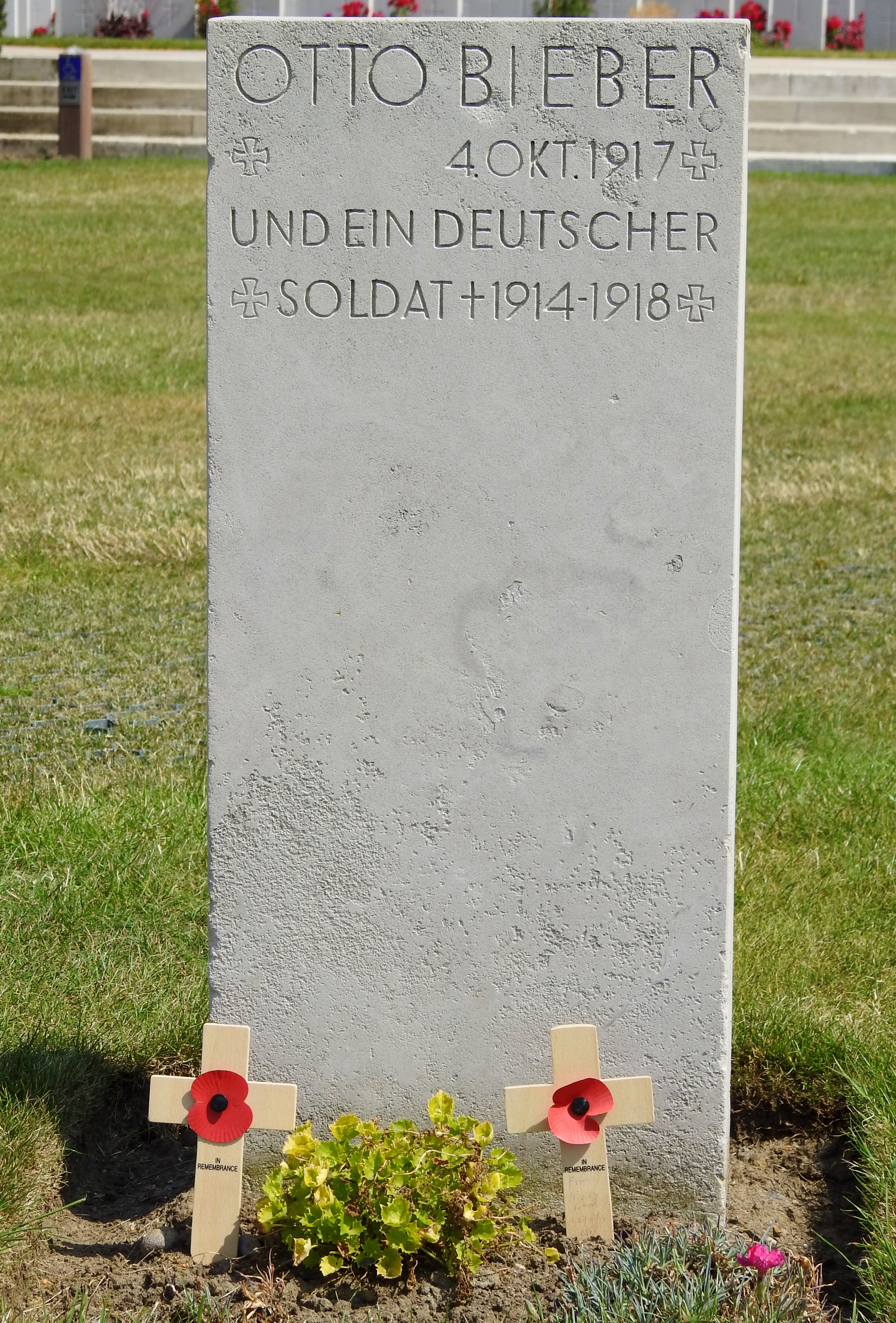
A single marker for two of the four German graves at Tyne Cot. One soldier is named, the other is unknown.

A two-minute video recording of the location
