= Christopher Pugsley =

New Zealand military historian

Christopher Pugsley ONZM
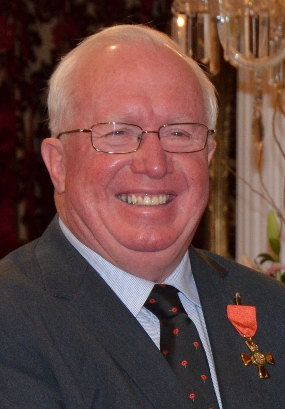
- Pugsley in 2015
- Born: Christopher John Pugsley; 1947 (age 78–79)

Academic background
- Education: University of Waikato (PhD)

Academic work
- Institutions: Royal Military Academy Sandhurst; University of New England; Victoria University of Wellington
- Main interests: Military history Imperial and Commonwealth history New Zealand

Christopher John Pugsley ONZM (born 1947) is a New Zealand military historian. He is published as Chris Pugsley and Christopher Pugsley.

== Career ==
Pugsley became interested in writing in 1984 when, as a career officer in the New Zealand Army, he worked on a television documentary about New Zealand's involvement in the Gallipoli campaign and authored Gallipoli: The New Zealand Story, which was shortlisted for the Goodman Fielder Wattie Book Award the same year.

In 1988, he retired from the New Zealand Army to dedicate himself to a new career as an historian.

=== Academic career ===
He received his PhD from the University of Waikato in 1992, and in 1994 he became writing fellow at the Victoria University of Wellington. He then taught at University of New England, Australia from 1996 to 1999. Until 2014 he was senior lecturer in war studies at the Royal Military Academy Sandhurst and adjunct senior fellow at New Zealand's University of Canterbury.

== Areas of interest ==
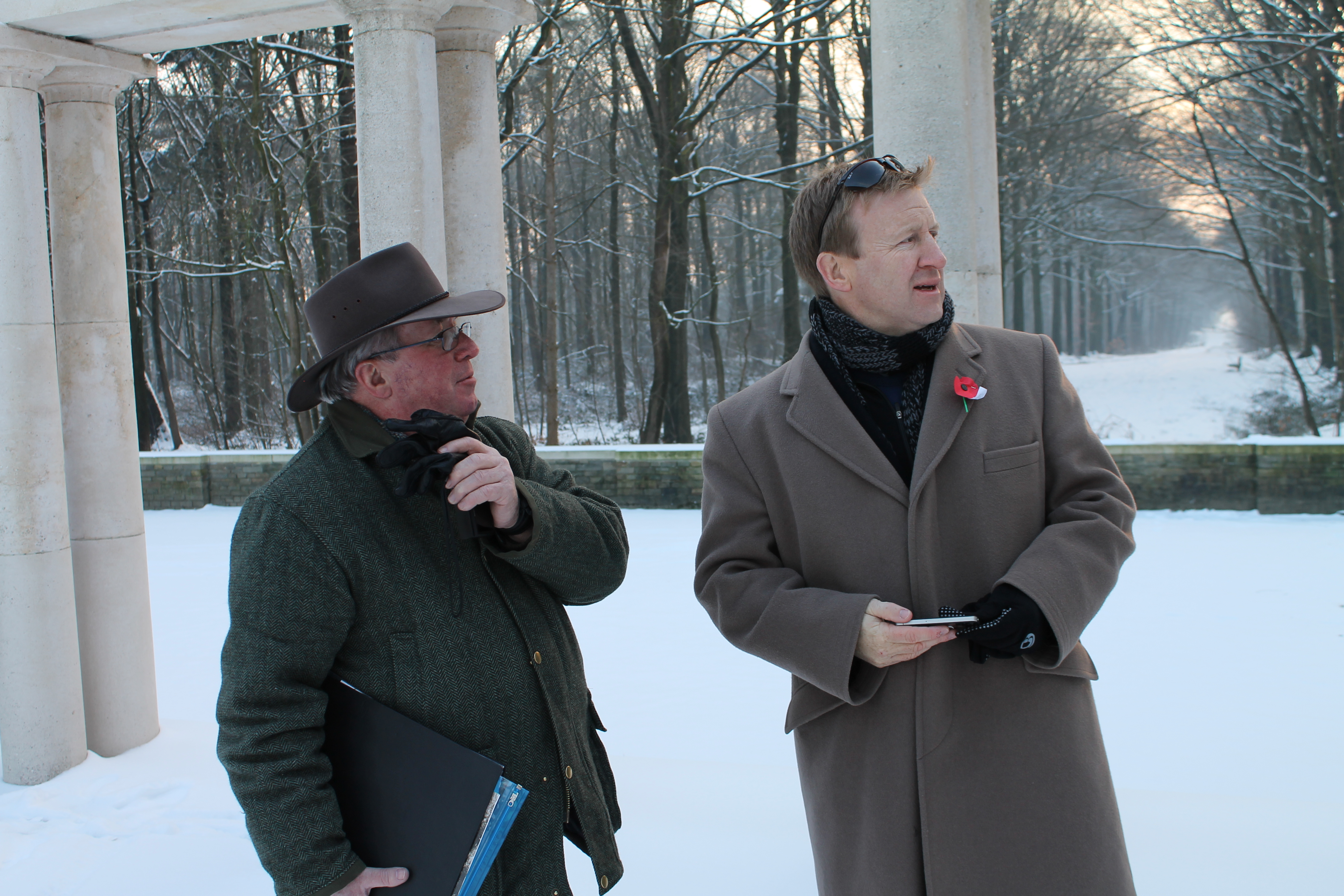
Pugsley (left) with New Zealand Minister of Defence Jonathon Coleman, at the Buttes New British Cemetery New Zealand Memorial, Belgium, February 2012

During the 1990s he wrote a series of detailed articles called "Walking the Waikato Wars", in the now defunct New Zealand Defence Quarterly, in which he visited each Waikato Battle site and reviewed each battle through the eyes of a modern professional military officer using photographs and maps to illustrate events.

His primary area of interest is 20th-century New Zealand, Australian, Canadian and British Commonwealth military history, with particular focus on Gallipoli, and the Western Front.

== Honours ==
In the 2015 New Year Honours, Pugsley was appointed an Officer of the New Zealand Order of Merit, for services as a military historian. In 2011 the University of Waikato recognised him with a distinguished alumni award.

== Publications ==
- Pugsley, C Le Quesnoy 1918: New Zealand's Last Battle (2018: Oratia Media) ISBN 978-0-947506-49-0
- Pugsley, C A Bloody Road Home: World War Two and New Zealand's Heroic Second Division (2014: Penguin) ISBN 978-0-143-57189-6
- Pugsley, C. & Holdsworth, A; Sandhurst: A Tradition of Leadership (2005: Third Millennium) ISBN 978-1-903942-39-0
- Pugsley, C. Operation Cobra (Battle Zone Normandy) (2004: Sutton) ISBN 978-0-7509-3015-4
- Pugsley, C. From Emergency to Confrontation: The New Zealand Armed Forces in Malaya and Borneo 1949–1966 (2003: OUP Australia and New Zealand) ISBN 978-0-19-558453-0
- Pugsley, C. The Anzac Experience: New Zealand, Australia and Empire in the First World War (2001: Reed New Zealand) ISBN 978-0-7900-0941-4
- Pugsley, C. Anzac: The New Zealanders at Gallipoli (2000: Reed New Zealand) ISBN 978-1-86948-838-3
- Pugsley, C. & Moses, J. The German Empire and Britain's Pacific Dominions (2000: Regina) ISBN 978-1-930053-00-7
- Pugsley, C. The Anzacs at Gallipoli: A Story for Anzac Day (1999: Reed New Zealand) ISBN 978-1869488154
- Pugsley, C. Scars on the heart: Two centuries of New Zealand at war (1996: Auckland Museum) ISBN 978-1-86953-301-4
- Pugsley, C. Te Hokowhitu a Tu: the Maori Pioneer Battalion in the First World War (1995: Reed New Zealand) ISBN 978-0-7900-0439-6
- Pugsley, C. On the Fringe of Hell (1991: Hodder & Stoughton) ISBN 978-0-340-53321-5
- Pugsley, C. Gallipoli: the New Zealand Story (1984: Hodder & Stoughton) ISBN 0-340-33877-6
