= Vampire dugout =

WWI Belgian underground shelter in Zonnebeke

Site information
- Open to the public: No

Location
- Coordinates: 50.870799°N 2.960371°E

Site history
- In use: Battle of Passchendaele; Battle of the Lys
- Events: World War One

Garrison information
- Occupants: 100 Brigade, 33rd Division; 16th King's Royal Rifle Corps; 9th Battalion Highland Light Infantry; German Empire; 2nd Battalion Worcestershire Regiment

The Vampire dugout (known locally in Belgium as the Vampyr dugout), is a First World War underground shelter located near the Belgian village of Zonnebeke. It was created as a British brigade headquarters in early 1918 by the 171st Tunnelling Company of the Royal Engineers after the Third Battle of Ypres/Battle of Passchendaele.

Rediscovered in 2007, the Vampire dugout was the subject of a 2008 British television programme (Time Team) which was also broadcast abroad. The structure is inaccessible to the public, but inspected regularly by battlefield historians.

== History ==
=== Background ===
At the end of the Battle of Passchendaele, having expanded the Ypres Salient by retaking Passendale Ridge, the British were left with little natural shelter from the former woods and farms. The artillery of both sides had flattened the landscape. As the static nature of the conflict gave way to a more mobile war, and the opposing sides developed better technology and tactics, particularly in artillery, the need arose to protect troops within deeper and deeper shelters close to the frontline. What started out as simple blast shelters turned over time into subterranean hospitals, mess rooms, chapels, kitchens, workshops, blacksmiths, as well as bedrooms where exhausted soldiers could rest.

Needing shelter for their troops on Passendale Ridge, the Allied High Command in January 1918 moved 25,000 specialist tunnellers of the Royal Engineers and 50,000 attached infantry to the north-east of Ypres. Most of the men involved had prepared and taken part in the Battle of Messines (7–14 June 1917), where they had dug 26 deep mines as well as nearly 200 individual shelter structures at depths of 30 m (98 ft) into the local blue clay. These underground barracks built by the Royal Engineers could accommodate units from 50 men up to 2,000 as in the largest dugouts at Wieltje and Hill 63. Connected by corridors measuring 6 ft 6 in (2.0 m) high by 4 ft (1.2 m) wide, the deep dugouts were fitted with water pumps to deal with the high groundwater tables in the area. The level of these World War I underground activities can be gauged by the fact that by March 1918, more people lived beneath the surface in the Ypres area than reside above ground in the town today.

=== Construction ===
Vampire was built to house a brigade headquarters of up to 50 men and one senior commanding officer. Located close to Polygon Wood, it was named after the supply soldiers whose mission was to come out at night to resupply troops in the front line. Located 14 m (46 ft) below Flanders and dug over a period of four months by 171st Tunnelling Company, the Royal Engineers used I beams and reclaimed railway line in a D-type sett structure. This was then further reinforced using stepped wooden horizontal beams.

=== Operational use ===
Vampire became operational from early April 1918, first housing the 100th Brigade of the British 33rd Division, then the 16th King's Royal Rifle Corps and then the 9th Battalion Highland Light Infantry Regiment. But after only a few weeks, the dugout was lost when the Germans undertook the Battle of the Lys in April 1918. It was recaptured in September 1918, when its last occupants became the 2nd Battalion of the Worcestershire Regiment.

When Vampire was excavated in 2008 (see below), the archaeologists found many signs inside the dugout of occupation by the British, but few from the Germans. There was a total absence of metal bed structures, suggesting that the British had had little time to fit out the dugout before it was overrun. The researchers first estimated that the dugout would measure 200 m (660 ft) by 150 m (490 ft), but tunnels were eventually found to cover an area of 800 m (2,600 ft) by 600 m (2,000 ft). Designed by the Royal Engineers to house 50 men, the researchers now estimate that Vampire may have been used by at least 300 soldiers. Whether Vampire was extended by the British or the Germans will take further investigation, although signs of construction in progress have been found throughout the workings.

=== Occupying units ===
- 100 Brigade Headquarters, 33rd Division
- 16th Battalion (Church Lads Brigade) King's Royal Rifle Corps
- 1st/9th Battalion Highland Light Infantry
- 2nd Battalion Worcestershire Regiment

These three battalions were the three constituent battalions of 100 Brigade

=== Vampire after the war: 1920 onwards ===
After the cessation of hostilities in November 1918, all deep dugouts including Vampire were abandoned. When the troops left within weeks of the war ending, the subterranean structures were slowly submerged. After the removal of known munitions at the surface by military clean-up teams, the Belgian locals returned from 1920, recovering the upper sections of the wooden entrance steps for heat and building, and then filled the main shafts with rubble to enable the land to be returned to farming. Locals also resumed extracting the local blue clay for commercial purposes, mainly in brickworks. The gradual expansion of the commercial extraction activities by the Terca Zonnebeke N.V. brickworks factory has over time led to the rediscovery of several World War I underground structures.

=== Zonnebeke's underground war legacy ===
Today, the district of Zonnebeke and its five villages – located at the centre of the area devastated by the Battle of Passchendaele – have the largest concentration of recorded World War I underground constructions. Most deep dugouts are now flooded, which has helped to preserve them, and they are now the most authentic relics of the Great War in Flanders.

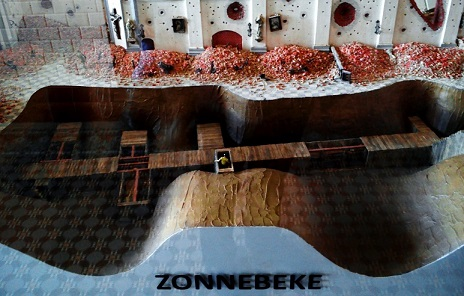
The Zonnebeke Church Dugout, constructed by 171st Tunnelling Company in 1918 (model)

In addition to the Vampire dugout, 171st Tunnelling Company also constructed a deep dugout in the centre of Zonnebeke, located directly beneath the ruins of the parish church. This dugout was only discovered during archaeological excavations of the Augustinian abbey. Today, the outline of this dugout is marked in an archaeological garden within the church grounds, and a model of the church dugout can be seen at the "Memorial Museum Passchendaele 1917" in Zonnebeke.

About 180 dugout sites have been located in the Ypres Salient, and in the 1990s some of them were entered, at least in part. In 1983, the Australian-built Bremen Redoubt was discovered at the rear of the Terca Zonnebeke N.V. brickworks in Zonnebeke. Opened to the public until 1998, it is believed that its eventual collapse was due to drying support timbers. On 21 February 1998, a farmer’s wife disappeared into the ground while washing the windows. Beecham dugout was subsequently discovered less than 400 m (1,300 ft) from Tyne Cot Cemetery.

== Rediscovery of the dugout ==
In spring 2006, it was made public that the Terca Zonnebeke N.V. brickworks had received a licence for the extension of its blue clay extraction zone. In response, research by the Association for Battlefield Archaeology and Conservation (ABAC) carried out by the Belgian tunnel explorer Johan Vandewalle and the British historian and filmmaker Peter Barton, who compiled a directory of 350 World War I underground structures, managed to show that at least one such structure, believed to be Vampire dugout, was near the proposed brickworks development zone.

Following discussion with local preservation, council and state officials, the ABAC was allowed to start a formal research project into the Vampire dugout's history. In light of the Highland Light Infantry's use of the dugout, the ABAC also involved the Centre for Battlefield Archaeology at Glasgow University to provide archaeological support.

=== Excavation and exploration ===
After further map analysis in 2006, a joint Belgian/British team led by Vandewalle and Barton went to Zonnebeke in the summer of 2007 to hunt for the Vampire dugout. They were accompanied by the battlefield archaeologists Tony Pollard and Iain Banks, the geophysicist Malcolm Weale and a camera team tasked with filming the excavations for a television documentary. Working from original trench maps, using geophysical survey and extensive digging with a mechanical excavator, Pollard and Banks managed to identify the entrance shaft of Vampire on the seventh and last day of their investigation. Excavations of Vampire's underground structures started in January 2008.

In spring 2008, the team returned to Zonnebeke with a larger group, including members of Buckinghamshire Fire and Rescue Service who would later carry out a training exercise in the dugout's tunnels. With the aim of clearing the entrance shaft and reaching the bottom, and then investigating the dugout itself, they had a set period before the land would again be reclaimed by the farmer and used for sowing winter barley. As the local blue clay proved too hard for certain extraction methods, and too soft for others, the team eventually used a high-pressure fireman's hose to liquify it, and then extract it by pump into a settlement tank.

After three weeks, the team reached the shaft bottom, from where the researchers used a remotely operated vehicle to assess the structure's stability. Additional props were then inserted by mining experts to ensure the safety of the team. As part of the Time Team TV production for Channel 4, presenter Tony Robinson was filmed within the still-damp but highly preserved dugout. The excavation was eventually broadcast on UK television as "The Lost WWI Bunker" (Time Team Special 33, aired on 10 November 2008), and was also shown on the Science Channel in the United States.

After the end of the filming, the Vampire dugout entrance shaft was covered again to ensure its preservation, and the dugout allowed to refill with water. The archaeologists felt that this was the best course of action as the dugout had been preserved in this manner for 90 years. This was in light of previous experience with similar structures, such as the Bremen Redoubt, which were lost due to timber degradation in the dry atmosphere. Vampire, inaccessible to the public as it is located on private property, is inspected every year by local battlefield historians.

== Future of the Vampire dugout ==
As the Zonnebeke brickworks expands, and as the land in which Vampire sits is designated as a potential future quarrying area, the dugout's future is uncertain. Even if it is preserved, the quarrying works could threaten its future due to the egress of water from the nearby works creating cracks in the blue clay. Because of their historical significance, their age and related safety concerns, as well as the experience of Bremen Redoubt's collapse, World War I dugouts are generally not accessible to the public. A lifelike reconstruction of a British deep dugout has been built in the museum in Passchendaele.
