= 254th Tunnelling Company =

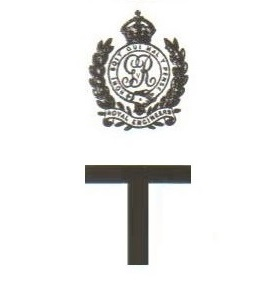
- Active: World War I
- Country: United Kingdom
- Branch: British Army
- Type: Royal Engineer tunnelling company
- Role: military engineering, tunnel warfare
- Nickname: "The Moles"
- Engagements: World War I

The 254th Tunnelling Company was one of the tunnelling companies of the Royal Engineers created by the British Army during World War I. The tunnelling units were occupied in offensive and defensive mining involving the placing and maintaining of mines under enemy lines, as well as other underground work such as the construction of deep dugouts for troop accommodation, the digging of subways, saps (a narrow trench dug to approach enemy trenches), cable trenches and underground chambers for signals and medical services.

== Background ==
By January 1915 it had become evident to the BEF at the Western Front that the Germans were mining to a planned system. As the British had failed to develop suitable counter-tactics or underground listening devices before the war, field marshals French and Kitchener agreed to investigate the suitability of forming British mining units. Following consultations between the Engineer-in-Chief of the BEF, Brigadier George Fowke, and the mining specialist John Norton-Griffiths, the War Office formally approved the tunnelling company scheme on 19 February 1915.

Norton-Griffiths ensured that tunnelling companies numbers 170 to 177 were ready for deployment in mid-February 1915. In the spring of that year, there was constant underground fighting in the Ypres Salient at Hooge, Hill 60, Railway Wood, Sanctuary Wood, St Eloi and The Bluff which required the deployment of new drafts of tunnellers for several months after the formation of the first eight companies. The lack of suitably experienced men led to some tunnelling companies starting work later than others. The number of units available to the BEF was also restricted by the need to provide effective counter-measures to the German mining activities. To make the tunnels safer and quicker to deploy, the British Army enlisted experienced coal miners, many outside their nominal recruitment policy. The first nine companies, numbers 170 to 178, were each commanded by a regular Royal Engineers officer. These companies each comprised 5 officers and 269 sappers; they were aided by additional infantrymen who were temporarily attached to the tunnellers as required, which almost doubled their numbers. The success of the first tunnelling companies formed under Norton-Griffiths' command led to mining being made a separate branch of the Engineer-in-Chief's office under Major-General S.R. Rice, and the appointment of an 'Inspector of Mines' at the GHQ Saint-Omer office of the Engineer-in-Chief. A second group of tunnelling companies were formed from Welsh miners from the 1st and 3rd Battalions of the Monmouthshire Regiment, who were attached to the 1st Northumberland Field Company of the Royal Engineers, which was a Territorial unit. The formation of twelve new tunnelling companies, between July and October 1915, helped to bring more men into action in other parts of the Western Front.

Most tunnelling companies were formed under Norton-Griffiths' leadership during 1915, and one more was added in 1916. On 10 September 1915, the British government sent an appeal to Canada, South Africa, Australia and New Zealand to raise tunnelling companies in the Dominions of the British Empire. On 17 September, New Zealand became the first Dominion to agree the formation of a tunnelling unit. The New Zealand Tunnelling Company arrived at Plymouth on 3 February 1916 and was deployed to the Western Front in northern France. A Canadian unit was formed from men on the battlefield, plus two other companies trained in Canada and then shipped to France. Three Australian tunnelling companies were formed by March 1916, resulting in 30 tunnelling companies of the Royal Engineers being available by the summer of 1916.

== Unit history ==
254th Tunnelling Company included a significant number of miners from South Wales, as did the 184th, 170th, 171st, 172nd and 253rd Tunnelling Company.

254th Tunnelling Company was formed in England and moved to Gallipoli in December 1915, where it merged with the existing VIII Corps Mining Company – but too late to have any serious impact on operations there. VIII Corps Mining Company was an improvised unit formed on Gallipoli, which had seen much activity against the Turks in the Helles area between mid-1915 and December of that year, when it was merged into the newly arrived 254th Tunnelling Company. From Gallipoli, 254th Tunnelling Company was moved to France and relieved 176th Tunnelling Company in the northern Givenchy area in Spring 1916. It served under Fourth Army from September 1916 until after the end of the war.

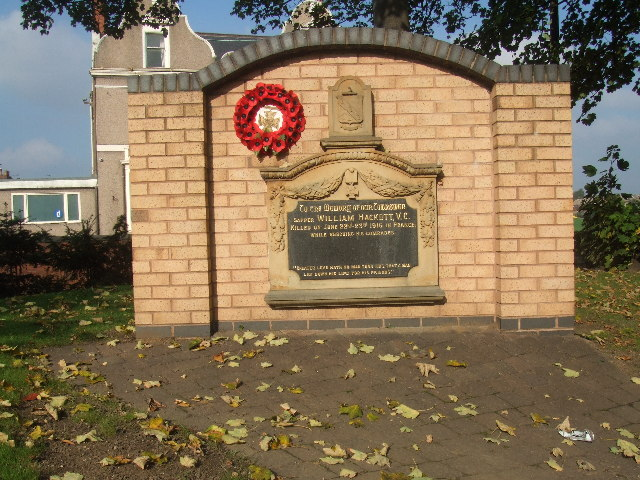
Memorial to Sapper William Hackett VC in Mexborough

Sapper William Hackett was posthumously awarded the Victoria Cross for losing his life in an attempt to help fellow miners when a tunnel collapsed at Shaftesbury Avenue Mine at Givenchy-lès-la-Bassée on 26 June 1916. On 22 June, Hackett and four other miners of 254th Tunnelling Company were 35 feet (11 m) underground heading towards enemy lines when a German mine (Red Dragon) blew in 25 feet (7.6 m) of the tunnel, cutting them off. For two days they waited for rescuers to reach them. Hackett helped three men to safety but refused to leave until the last man, Thomas Collins, 22, of the 'Swansea Pals' (14th (Service) Battalion, Welsh Regiment (Swansea)), was saved. Hackett said simply: “I am a tunneller, I must look after the others first.” Fresh shelling caused the tunnel to collapse, entombing the two men alive. Sapper John French produced the only known eyewitness account. On 27 June he wrote: “Abandoned all hope of getting those two chaps out this morning & stopped all rescue work for the condition of the shaft was so bad to endanger the lives of the men working there...That chap Hackett died a hero for he would not leave his injured comrade.”

In Givenchy-lès-la-Bassée, the Tunnellers Memorial commemorates the action on 26 June 1916 for which Hackett was awarded the Victoria Cross. The memorial stands at the site of the Shaftesbury Shaft and the Red Dragon Crater. Its dimensions, 3.9 feet (120 cm) high and 2.6 feet (80 cm) wide, mirror the standard interior proportions of mine galleries constructed by the tunnelling companies in the Flanders clays. The memorial was designed by Peter Barton and unveiled on 19 June 2010.

== Notable members ==
- William Hackett VC (1873–1916) enlisted in the British Army on 25 October 1915, after having been rejected three times by the York and Lancaster Regiment for being too old and having been diagnosed with a heart condition. He spent two weeks of basic training at Chatham, joining 172nd Tunnelling Company. He was 43 years old and a Sapper in 254th Tunnelling Company when he performed a deed for which he was awarded the Victoria Cross on 22 June/23 June 1916 at Shaftesbury Avenue Mine, near Givenchy-lès-la-Bassée, France.

== See also ==
- Mine warfare

== Bibliography ==
- An overview of the history of 254th Tunnelling Company is also available in Robert K. Johns, Battle Beneath the Trenches: The Cornish Miners of 251 Tunnelling Company RE, Pen & Sword Military 2015 (ISBN 978-1473827004), p. 228 see online

=== Further reading ===
- Ritchie Wood (2017). Miners at War 1914-1919: South Wales Miners in the Tunneling Companies on the Western Front. Helion Limited. ISBN 978-1-91109-649-8.
- Alexander Barrie (10 October 1988). War Underground – The Tunnellers of the Great War. Tom Donovan Pub. ISBN 1-871085-00-4.
- The Work of the Royal Engineers in the European War 1914 -1919, – MILITARY MINING.
- Jones, Simon (2010). Underground Warfare 1914-1918. Pen & Sword Military. ISBN 978-1-84415-962-8.
- Arthur Stockwin (ed.), Thirty-odd Feet Below Belgium: An Affair of Letters in the Great War 1915-1916, Parapress (2005), ISBN 978-1-89859-480-2 (online).
- Graham E. Watson & Richard A. Rinaldi, The Corps of Royal Engineers: Organization and Units 1889–2018, Tiger Lily Books, 2018, ISBN 978-171790180-4.
