= Zonnebeke =

- Municipality
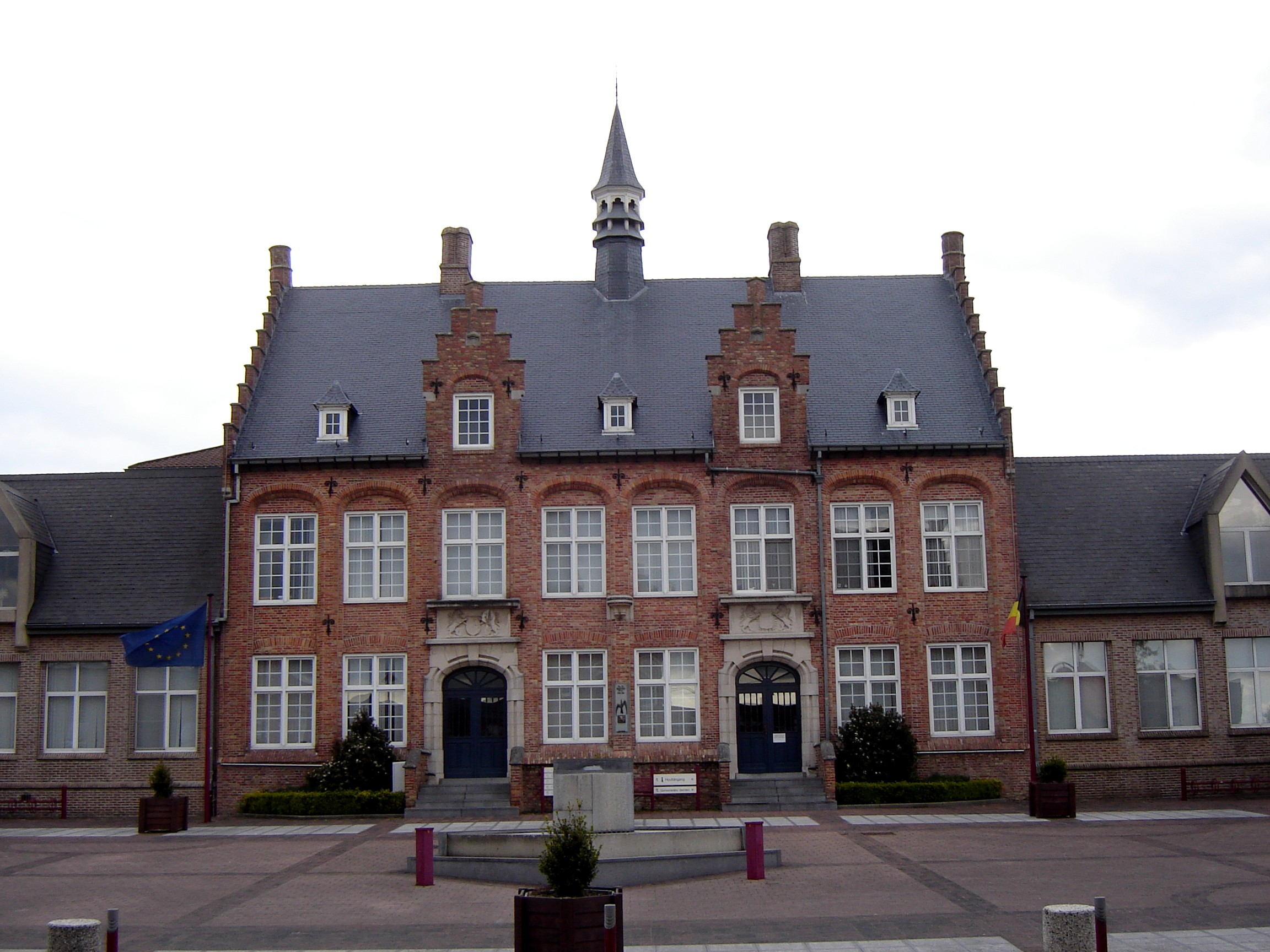
- Zonnebeke town hall

- Flag Coat of arms

- Location of Zonnebeke in West Flanders
- Interactive map of Zonnebeke
- Location in Belgium
- Coordinates: 50°52′N 02°59′E
- Country: Belgium
- Community: Flemish Community
- Region: Flemish Region
- Province: West Flanders
- Arrondissement: Ypres

Government
  - Mayor: Dirk Sioen (INSPRAAK)
  - Governing parties: INSPRAAK, CD&V

Area
  - Total: 68.09 km^{2} (26.29 sq mi)

Population (2018-01-01)
  - Total: 12,445
  - Density: 182.8/km^{2} (473.4/sq mi)
- Postal codes: 8980
- NIS code: 33037
- Area codes: 051/057
- Website: www.zonnebeke.be

Zonnebeke (Dutch pronunciation: [ˈzɔnəˌbeːkə]; West Flemish: Zunnebeke) is a municipality located in the Belgian province of West Flanders. The municipality comprises the villages of Beselare, Gheluvelt, Passendale, Zandvoorde and Zonnebeke proper. On January 1, 2006, Zonnebeke had a total population of 11,758. The total area is 67.57 km^{2} which gives a population density of 174 inhabitants per km^{2}.

== History ==
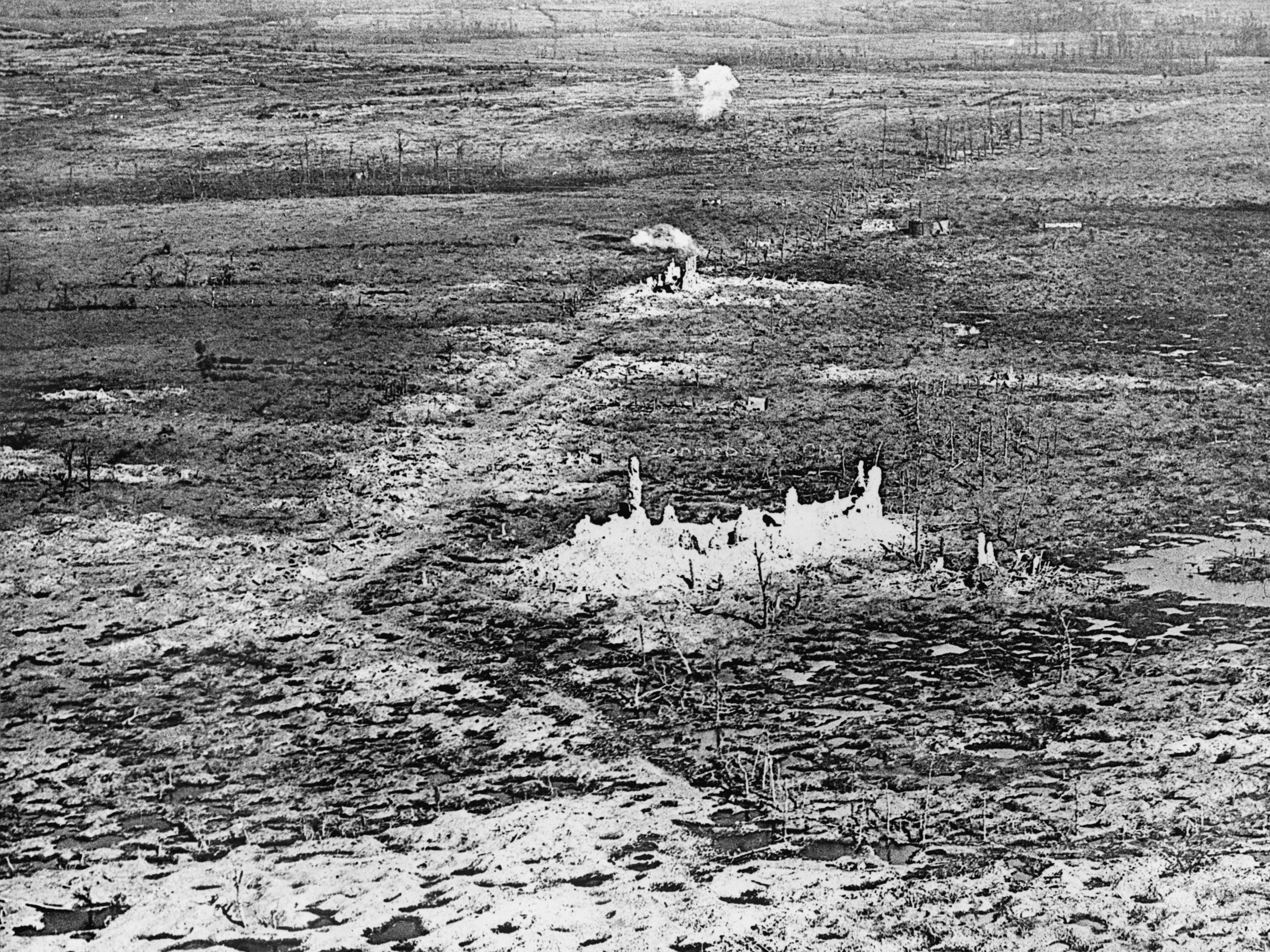
Destruction of Zonnebeke, 1918

The villages of Zonnebeke congregated around a large Augustinian abbey and its associated Benedictine convent in Nonnebosschen. Both were destroyed during the iconoclastic outbreak in 1580. Only the abbey was rebuilt, but was looted during the French occupation the abbey was confiscated. Passendale played a role in the Battle of Westrozebeke in 1382.

Situated in the centre of the Ypres Salient, World War I destroyed the whole area. Left abandoned until the early 1920s, people slowly returned and rebuilt the villages. In 1932, the locals opened a cheese making facility, which to this day is the only source of Passendale cheese.

Another battle during World War II during the Allied advance across Europe, where Passendale was used in a defensive operations by the Nazis, did little damage.

Today, Zonnebeke has returned to its long-time balance between agriculture, small business and work in the neighbouring towns. Its major industry is the brickworks in the village of Zonnebeke itself, which extracts the local blue clay.

== Zonnebeke underground ==
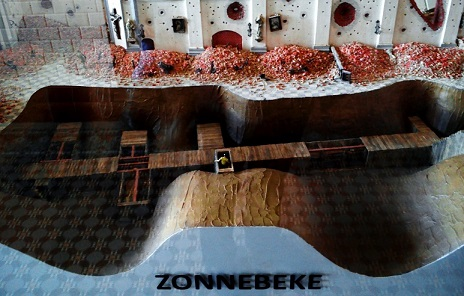
Zonnebeke Church Dugout constructed by 171st Tunnelling Company in 1918 (model)

The village and district of Zonnebeke and its five villages have the largest concentration of underground constructions from World War I, being located at the centre of the Third Battle of Ypres/Battle of Passchendaele. The blue-clay is now being extracted for commercial purposes by the Terca Zonnebeke N.V. brickworks factory, meaning that the structures are now regularly found as the brickworks expands its commercial extraction activities.

About 180 dugout sites have been located in the Ypres Salient and in the 1990s some of them were entered, at least in part.

In 1983, the Australian-built Bremen Redoubt was discovered at the rear of the Zonnebeke brickworks. Opened to the public until 1998, it is believed that its eventual collapse was due to drying support timbers.

During archaeological excavations of the Augustinian abbey, another dugout was discovered under Zonnebeke church. Today the outline of this dugout is marked in an archaeological garden within the church grounds, and a model of the church dugout can be seen at the "Memorial Museum Passchendaele 1917" in Zonnebeke.

On February 21, 1998, a farmer's wife disappeared into the ground while washing the windows. Beecham dugout was subsequently discovered less than 400 metres (1,300 ft) from Tyne Cot Cemetery.

It was made public in spring 2006 that the brickworks had received a licence for the extension of its blue-clay extraction zone. The Association for Battlefield Archaeology and Conservation, using maps compiled of 350 underground structures under the management of Belgian archaeologist Johan Vandewalle and British TV producer Peter Barton, showed that at least one structure was near to the proposed development zone, believed to be the Vampire dugout, which had been rediscovered in 2007. Following discussion with local preservation, historic, council and state officials, the ABAC was allowed to start a scientific research project. They engaged the Centre for Battlefield Archaeology at Glasgow University to provide archaeological support (in light of the residence of the Highland Light Infantry).

== Towns ==
The municipality comprises the villages of Zonnebeke proper, Beselare, Gheluvelt, Passendale and Zandvoorde. All are "deelgemeentes", meaning they were independent municipalities before the merger in the 1970s.

#	Name	Area (km^{2})	Population (01/01/2014)
I	Zonnebeke	16,55	4.472
II	Beselare	14,33	2.684
III	Gheluvelt	7,79	1.553
IV	Passendale	22,22	3.152
V	Zandvoorde	6,68	521

Zonnebeke, towns and neighbouring town. The yellow areas are urban areas.

The municipality of Zonnebeke borders the following towns and municipalities:

- a. Moorslede (municipality Moorslede) with village Slypskapelle
- b. Dadizele (municipality Moorslede)
- c. Geluwe (municipality Wervik)
- d. Wervik (municipality Wervik) with village Kruiseke
- e. Comines (Belgium) (municipality Comines-Warneton) with village Ten Brielen
- f. Houthem (municipality Comines-Warneton)
- g. Hollebeke (municipality Ypres)
- h. Zillebeke (municipality Ypres)
- i. Ypres (Ieper) (municipality Ypres)
- j. Langemark (municipality Langemark-Poelkapelle)
- k. Poelkapelle (municipality Langemark-Poelkapelle)
- l. Westrozebeke (municipality Staden)
- m. Oostnieuwkerke (municipality Staden)
- n. Roeselare (municipality Roeselare)

== See also ==
- Charles Holden
- Marquess of Becelaere

== Gallery ==
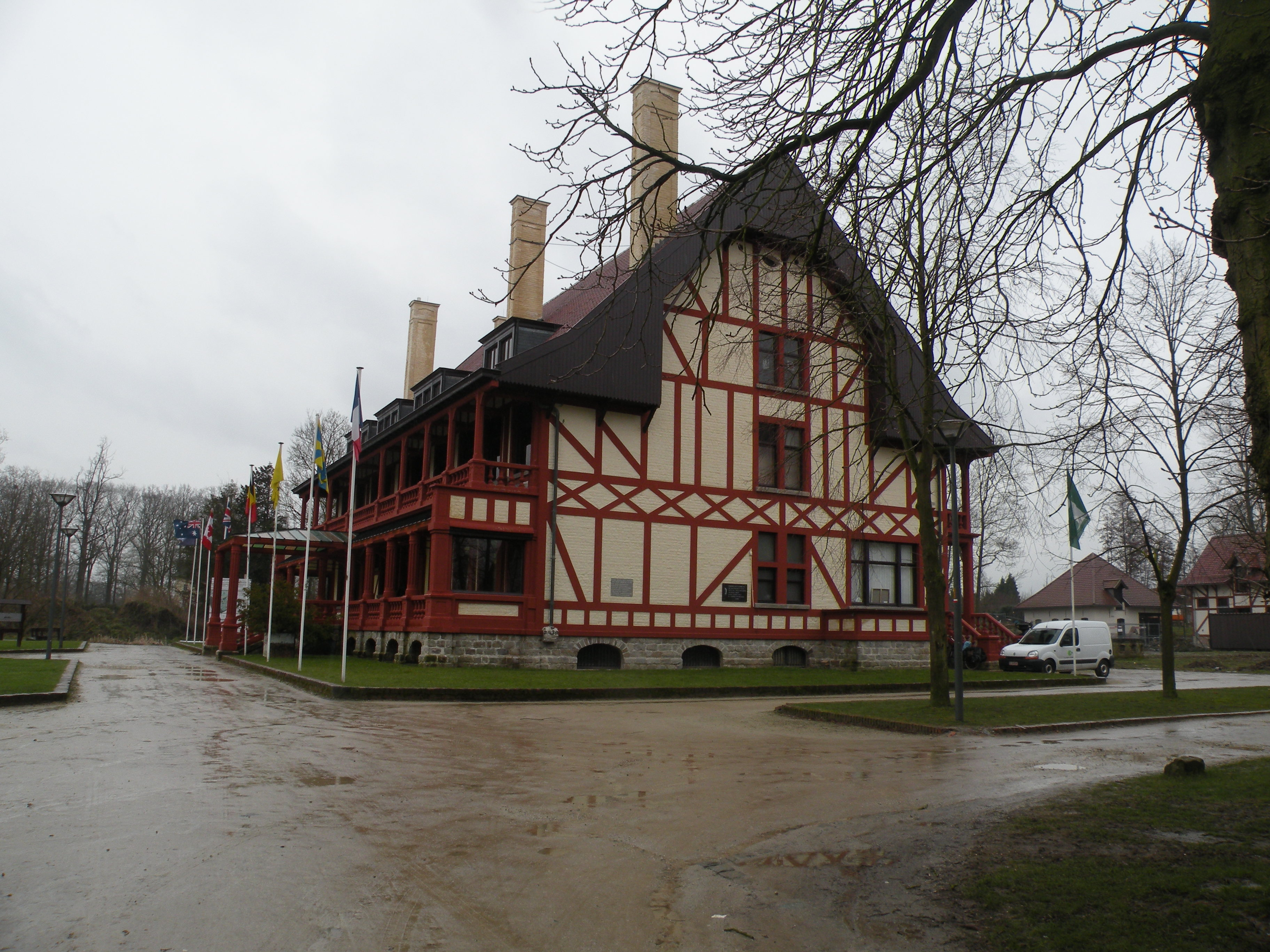
The Memorial Museum Passchendaele 1917

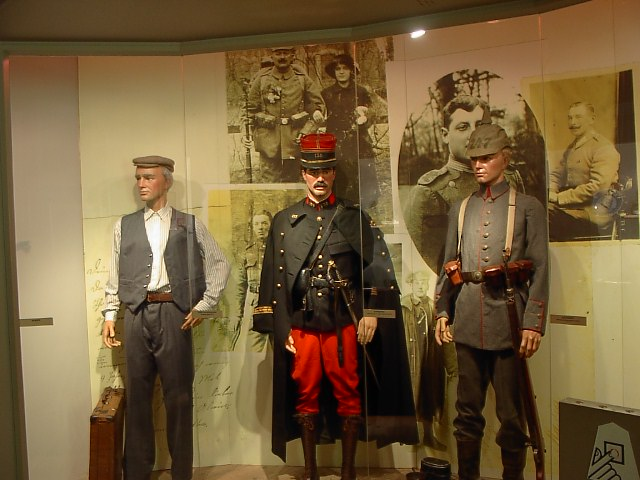
Memorial Museum Passchendaele, 1917 interior

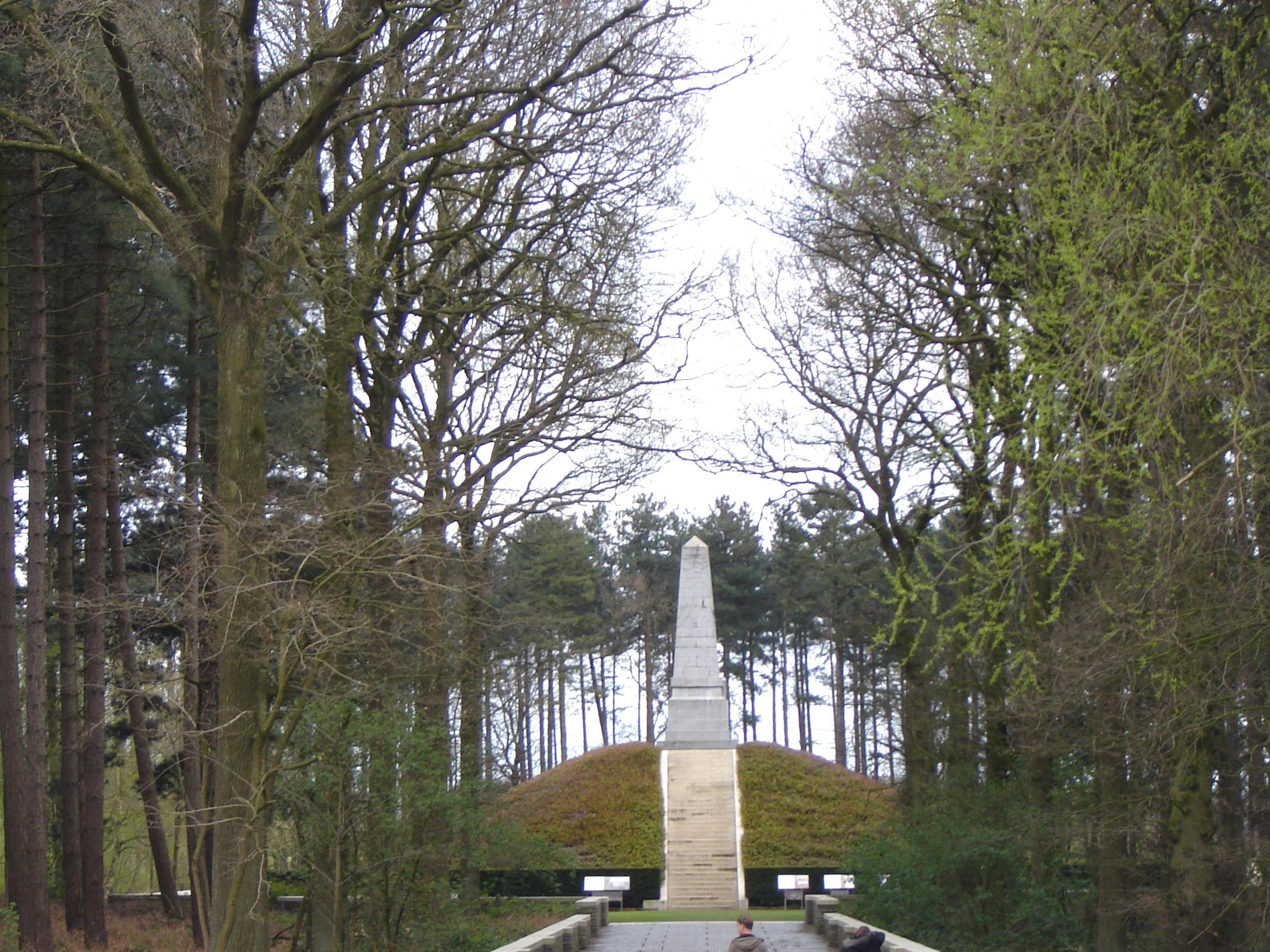
Memorial in the Polygon Wood, Zonnebeke

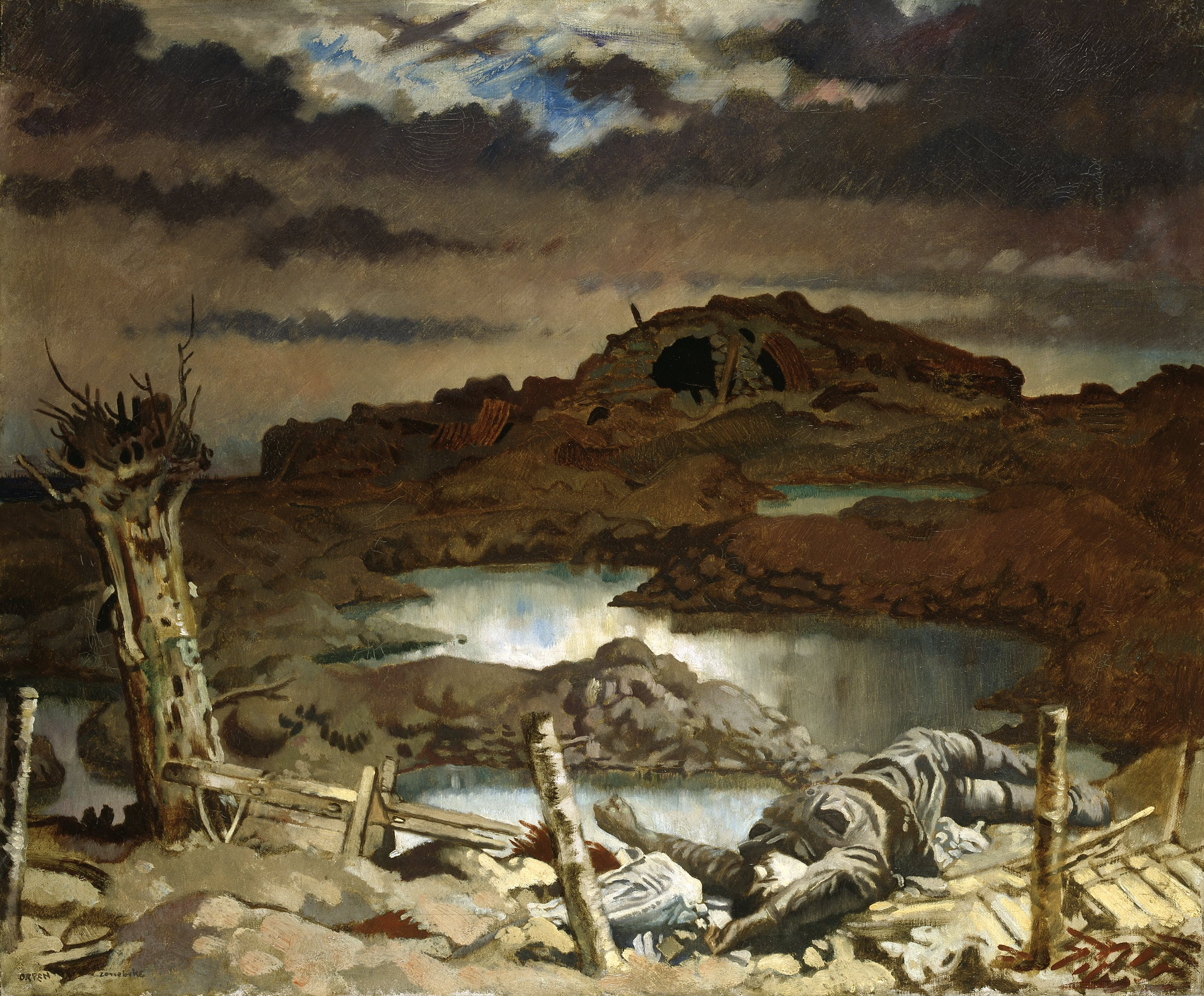
Zonnebeke (1918), painting by William Orpen, showing devastation after World War I
