= William Hackett (VC) =

Recipient of the Victoria Cross

- Born: 11 June 1873; Nottingham, England
- Died: 27 June 1916 (aged 43); Near Givenchy-lès-la-Bassée, France
- Burial place: Remembered on the Ploegsteert Memorial
- Military career
- Allegiance: United Kingdom
- Branch: British Army
- Service years: 1915–1916
- Rank: Sapper
- Unit: Royal Engineers
- Conflicts: World War I
- Awards: Victoria Cross

William Hackett VC (11 June 1873 – 27 June 1916) was an English recipient of the Victoria Cross, the highest and most prestigious award for gallantry in the face of the enemy that can be awarded to British and Commonwealth forces.

== Biography ==
Hackett was born 11 June 1873 to John and Harriet Hackett of Nottingham; he worked as a miner for 23 years. He was married to Alice née Tooby who received the medal on his behalf, and left two children, Arthur and Mary W. Hackett. After being rejected three times by the York and Lancaster Regiment for being too old, Hackett enlisted in the British Army on 25 October 1915, despite having been diagnosed with a heart condition. He spent two weeks of basic training at Chatham, joining 172nd Tunnelling Company. He later served with 254th Tunnelling Company, Corps of Royal Engineers. He was 43 years old and a Sapper in British Army during the First World War when he performed a deed for which he was awarded the Victoria Cross on 22 June/23 June 1916 at Shaftesbury Avenue Mine, near Givenchy-lès-la-Bassée, France. Hackett died in an attempt to help fellow miners when a tunnel collapsed at Shaftesbury Avenue Mine on 26 June 1916. His body was not recovered. Hackett is the only Tunneller ever to be awarded the Victoria Cross.

== Citation ==
For most conspicuous bravery when entombed with four others in a gallery owing to the explosion of an enemy mine. After working for 20 hours, a hole was made through fallen earth and broken timber, and the outside party was met. Sapper Hackett helped three of the men through the hole and could easily have followed, but refused to leave the fourth, who had been seriously injured, saying," I am a tunneller, I must look after the others first." Meantime, the hole was getting smaller, yet he still refused to leave his injured comrade. Finally, the gallery collapsed, and though the rescue party worked desperately for four days the attempt to reach the two men failed. Sapper Hackett, well knowing the nature of sliding earth, the chances against him, deliberately gave his life for his comrade. London Gazette, dated 4 August 1916

== Memorials ==
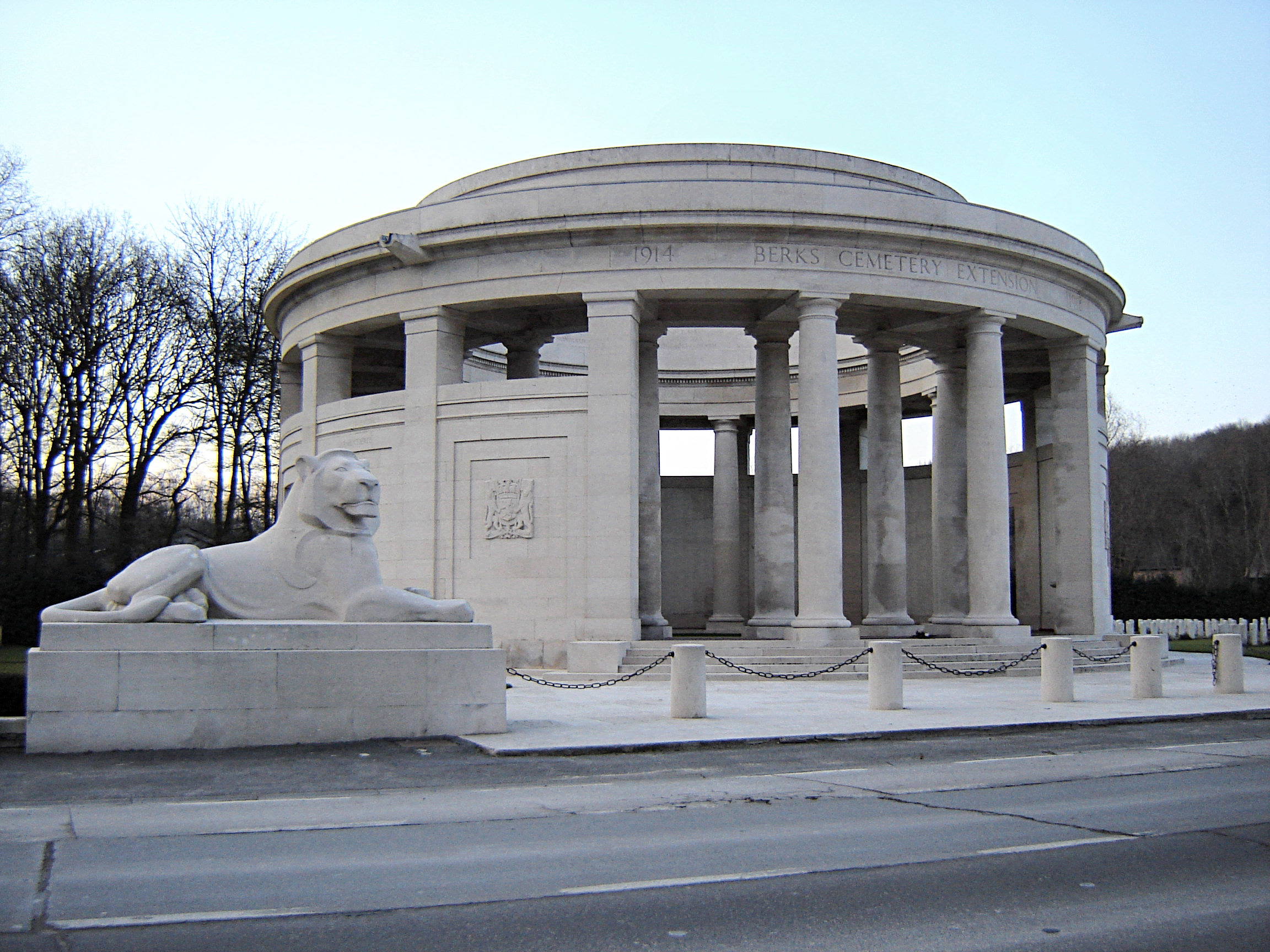
Ploegsteert Memorial to the Missing

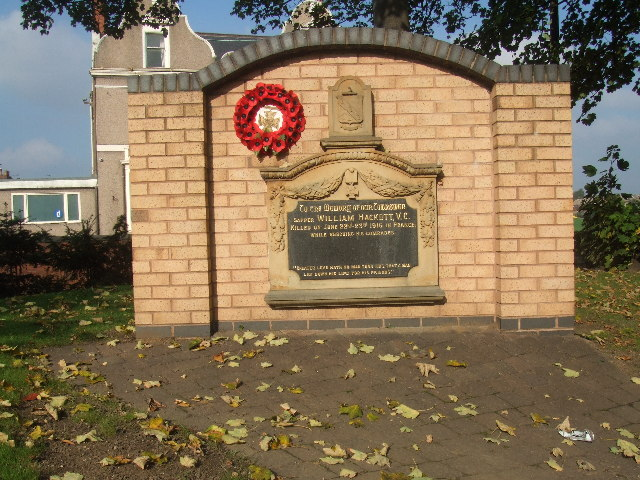
Memorial to Sapper William Hackett VC in Mexborough

At City War Memorial, Nottingham

Hacket has a square stone memorial set in the floor along with three other Nottingham veterans awarded the Victoria Cross at City War Memorial, Nottingham. Hackett's name is recorded on the Ploegsteert Memorial to the Missing in Berks Cemetery Extension near Ploegsteert in Hainaut, Belgium. His Victoria Cross is displayed at the Royal Engineers Museum (Chatham, England).

In Givenchy-lès-la-Bassée, the Tunnellers Memorial commemorates the action on 26 June 1916 for which Hackett was awarded the Victoria Cross. The memorial stands at the site of the Shaftesbury Shaft and the Red Dragon Crater. Its dimensions, 3.9 feet (120 cm) high and 2.6 feet (80 cm) wide, mirror the standard interior proportions of mine galleries constructed by the tunnelling companies in the Flanders clays. The memorial was designed by Peter Barton and unveiled on 19 June 2010.

== In fiction ==
A tunneller with the same name, also a miner during World War I, is the main character in the 2020 movie The War Below, though his eventual fate is different to that of the real Hackett.

The Trench, written by Oliver Lansley, performed by Les Enfants Terribles, and debuted at Edinburgh Fringe Festival in 2012 is a dramatized retelling of Hackett's story.

== Bibliography ==
- Gliddon, Gerald (2004) [2012]. VCs of the First World War: Cambrai 1917. The History Press. ISBN 978-0-75-247668-1.
- Whitworth, Alan (2012). Yorkshire VCs. Pen and Sword Books. ISBN 978-1-84884-778-1.
