= Passendale cheese =

Type of cheese originating in Belgium

Coordinates: 50°53′46.21″N 3°2′11.19″E

Passendale
- Other names: Passchendaele
- Country of origin: Belgium
- Region, town: Passendale
- Region: West Flanders
- Source of milk: Cows
- Pasteurized: Yes
- Texture: Semi-soft
- Fat content: Classic: 29%, Prelude: 29.4%
- Named after: Passendale

Passendale cheese, named for Passendale, the village where it originated, is one of the best-known cheeses of Belgium. Regular Passendale cheese is produced in two versions, Classic and Prelude. There is also a premium version, Passendale Bel Age.

Passendale cheese resembles a loaf of bread, with a round shape, and a hard but edible brown rind with spots of white. Inside, the flesh is golden, dotted with small holes and very creamy. It has a firm and damp consistency, slightly sweet bouquet and mild flavor.

== History ==
The Donck family of Passendale started producing cheeses in 1932 with the cooperation of many of the area's milk producers. After World War II, the family began producing milk, butter and yoghurt as well, and eventually relocated their business to a former brewery. In 1978, they launched "de Groot Hof–Grand'Ferme", a cheese inspired by local tradition. In 1980, it was renamed Passendale for export purposes. In 1991 the Comelco group, owner of the company making Passendale, was bought by the Dutch Campina company. The Bongrain group, which bought the company in 2007, has become the second-largest Belgian cheese producer.

== Types of Passendale ==
=== Classic and Prelude ===
At the end of the ripening process, the rind of Passendale Classic is brushed before it is packaged.

=== Passendale Bel Age ===
This special version of the cheese ripens for 6 months in the cellars of cheesemaker Passendale, and has a more distinguished taste.

== See also ==
- List of cheeses
