= Passendale =

Passendale Passchendaele
- Deelgemeente
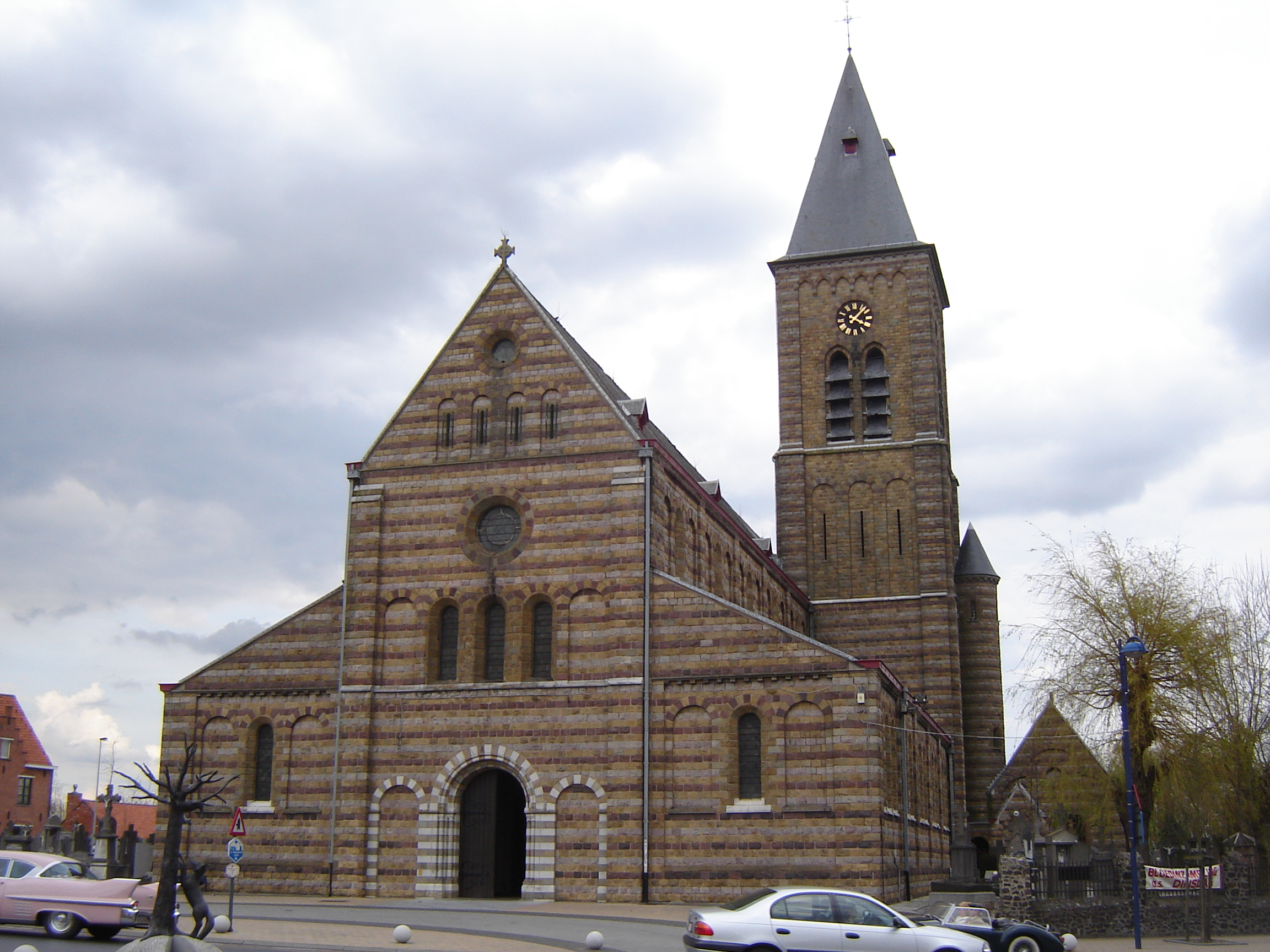

- Location within Belgium
- Coordinates: 50°54′01″N 3°01′14″E
- Country: Belgium
- Province: West Flanders
- Municipality: Zonnebeke

Area
  - Total: 22.22 km^{2} (8.58 sq mi)

Population (1999)
  - Total: 2,928
  - Density: 131.77/km^{2} (341.3/sq mi)
- Source: NIS
- Postal code: 8980

Passendale (Dutch: [ˈpɑsənˌdaːlə]) or Passchendaele (English: /ˈpæʃəndeɪl/ PASH-ən-dayl, French: [pasœndal]; West Flemish: Passchendoale) is a rural Belgian village in the Zonnebeke municipality of West Flanders province. It is close to the town of Ypres, situated on the hill ridge separating the historical wetlands of the Yser and Leie valleys. It is also commonly known as a battlefield and the name of a campaign during World War I, the Battle of Passchendaele.

== History ==
=== Early history ===
In the pre-Roman and Roman times the area of the town was located along the border between the Menapii and Morini Belgic tribes of northern Gaul and later the border between the bishoprics of Tournai and Thérouanne. The town is first recorded in 844 as Pascandale, and may be named after an individual by the name of Paulus or Pasko. In the Middle Ages, most of the region was ruled by the Augustine abbey of Zonnebeke and the Benedictine convent of Nonnebossen. Both the abbey and the convent were destroyed during an iconoclasm (Beeldenstorm) of 1580.

=== First World War ===
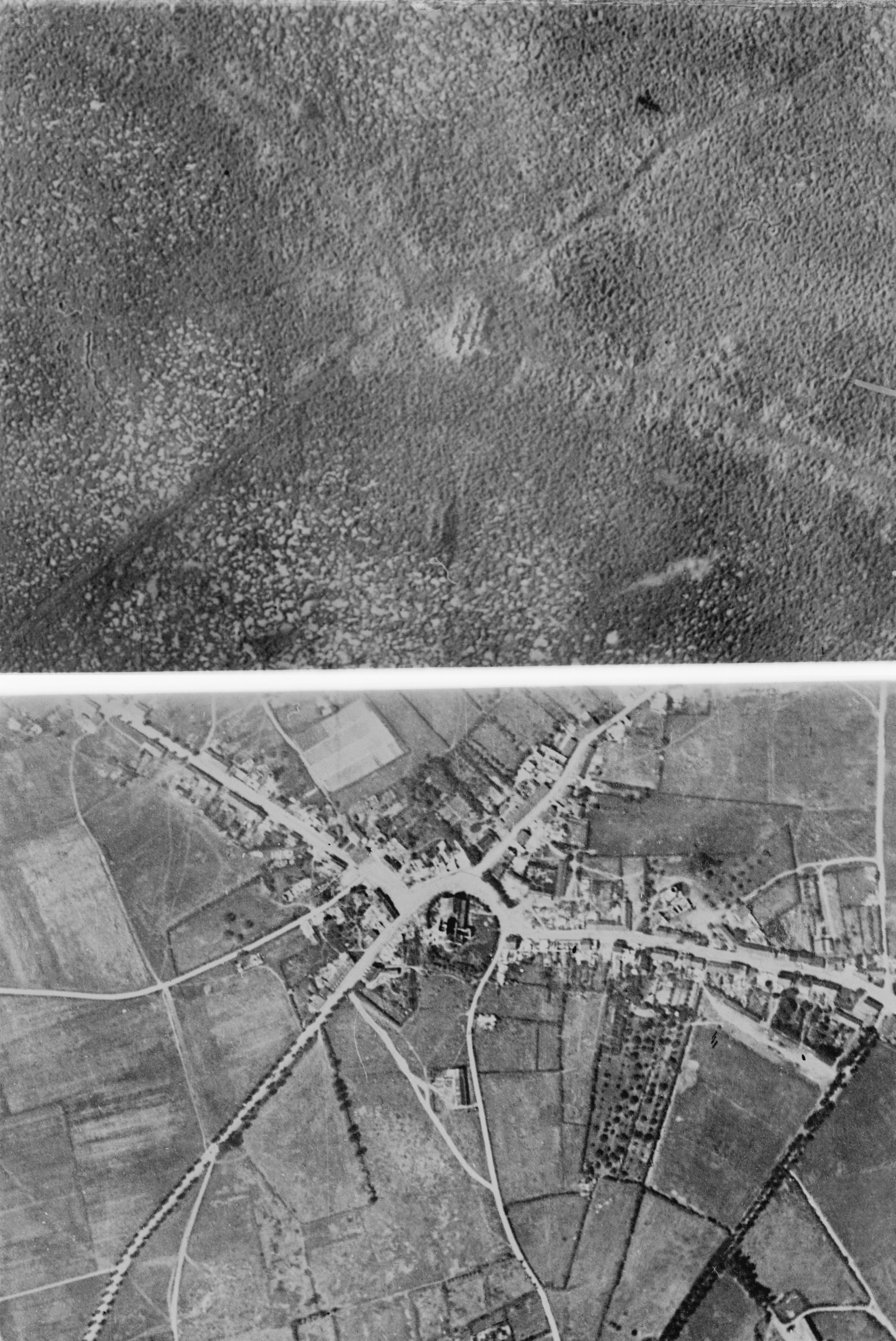
Passendale before and after the First World War

Passchendaele Ridge 60 m (200 ft) gives its name in common parlance to a battle of the First World War, officially the Third Battle of Ypres. It was a British-led offensive against the Germans, lasting from 31 July to 10 November 1917. Distinguishing features included the extensive rain leading up to it, as well as the relative absence of French troops. The government of France faced a massive mutiny at the time, having lost nearly four million troops to this point against the Central Powers. In addition to British, Canadian, Belgian, New Zealander, Australian and Indian troops fought on the side of the Allies, under the command of Field Marshal Douglas Haig.

The combination of a field littered with shell hole craters and relentless rain led to a battlefield having the consistency of porridge. The holes in the earth filled with water, debris, and bodies, causing nearly everything to be coated with a slick layer of slime. Despite the rain, contamination of the water supply led to massive dehydration and sickness amongst the troops on both sides during the long months of battle. Guns sank into the earth and troops drowned in the soft mud as they tried to charge the line.

Finally, after sixteen weeks of fighting in conditions which varied from rain, mud, and slime, to hot and dry weather with great clouds of dust, the initial objective of Passchendaele Ridge had been gained at a cost of 270,000 Allied casualties, including 17,000 officers. German casualties were likewise staggering, with 217,000 German casualties; the village was levelled.

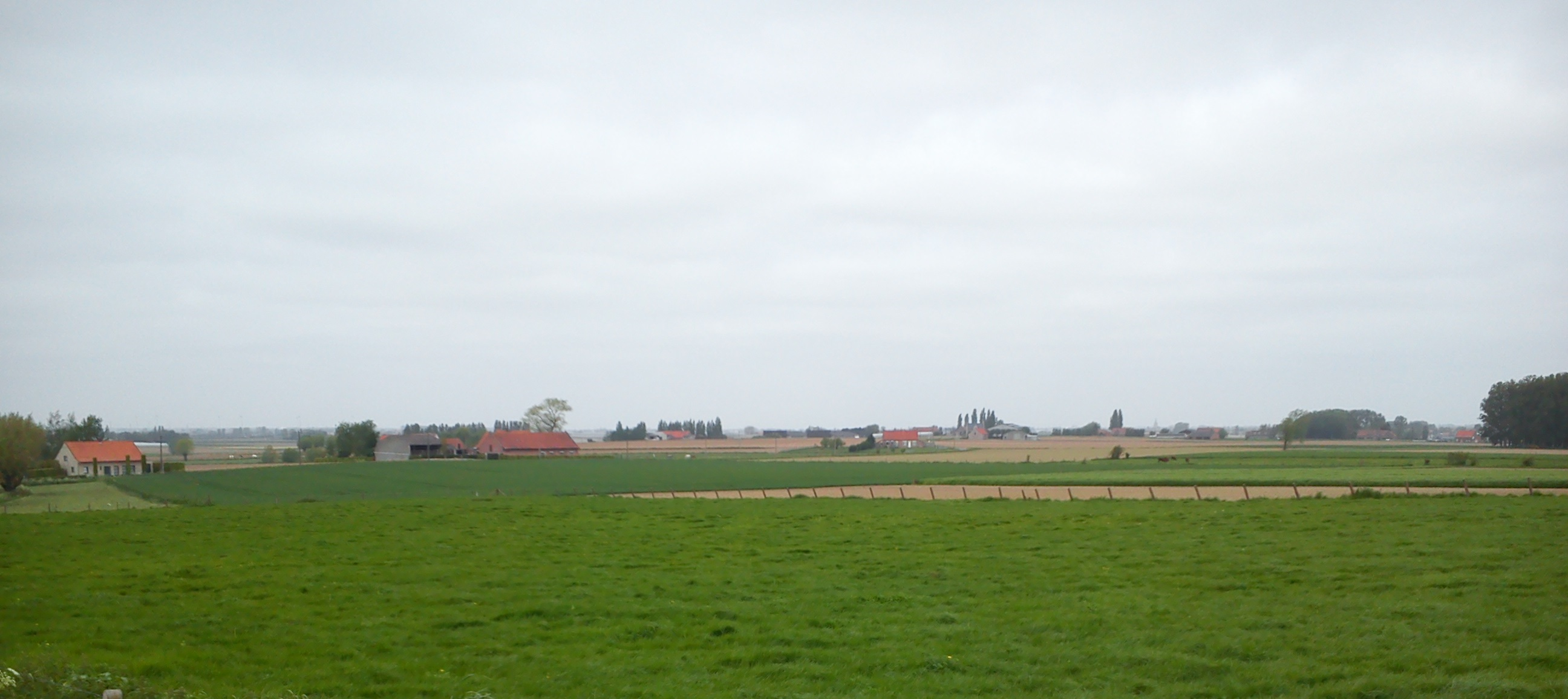
Fields at Passendale in 2015

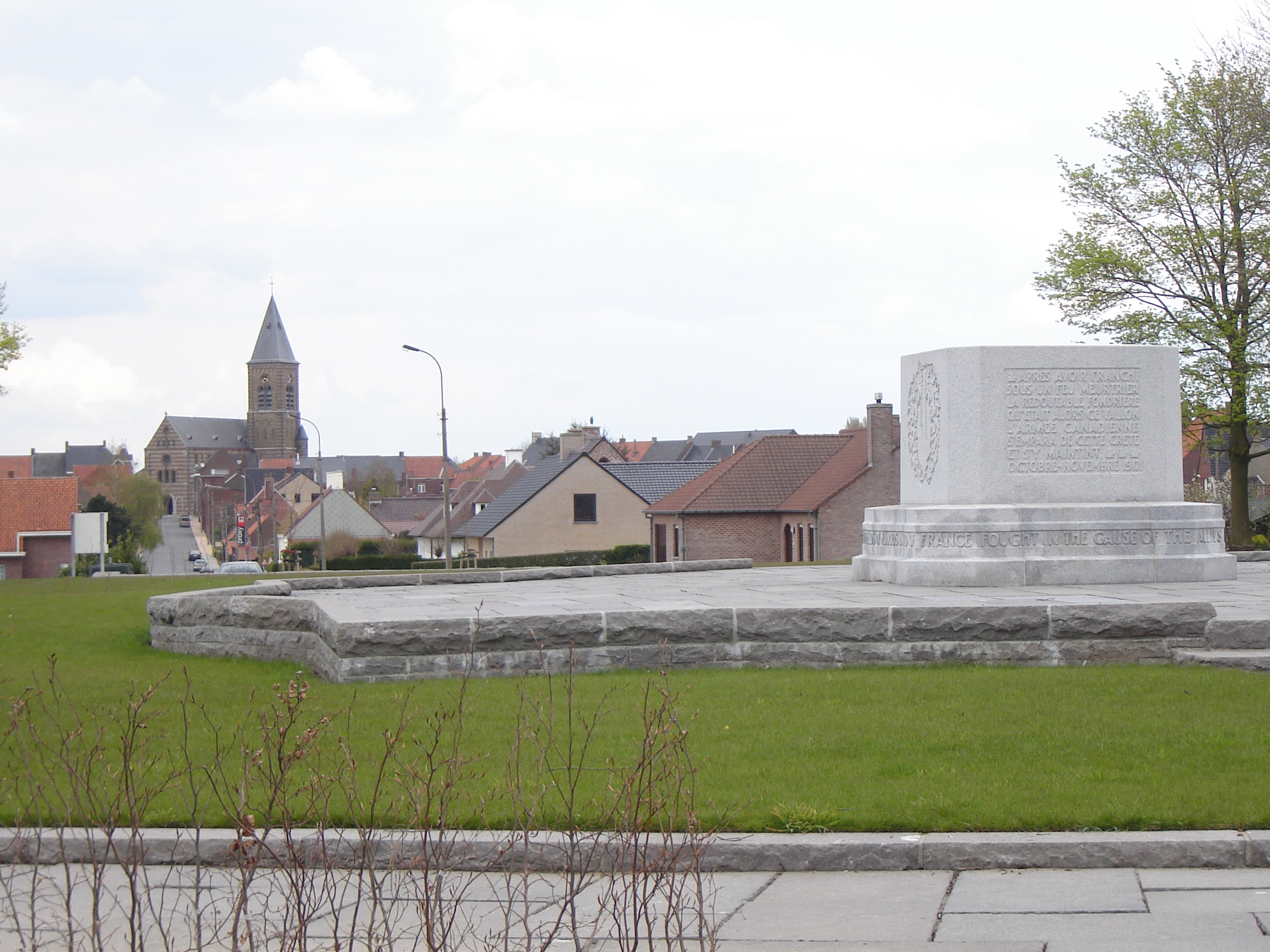
Canadian Memorial in Passendale

== Sights ==
Different nations' war cemeteries are found in Passendale: Tyne Cot Cemetery (the largest Commonwealth cemetery in the world), the New British Cemetery, the Canadian Memorial, and the New Zealand Forces Memorial. The town also hosts a war museum as well as numerous memorials dedicated to the different nationalities that participated in the epic battle.

Every year, Passendale hosts a number of commemorative events and exhibitions. Those of 2008 were the 90th memorial commemorations of the end of the First World War. Passchendaele (2008) was a Canadian film directed by Paul Gross about the Battle of Passchendaele.

== Local produce ==
Passendale is also known for Passendale cheese, and hosts an annual cheese festival every August. A blonde beer named Passchendaele is brewed by the Van Honsebrouck brewery in Ingelmunster.
