= Passchendaele Museum =

Belgian museum about the Battle of Passchendaele

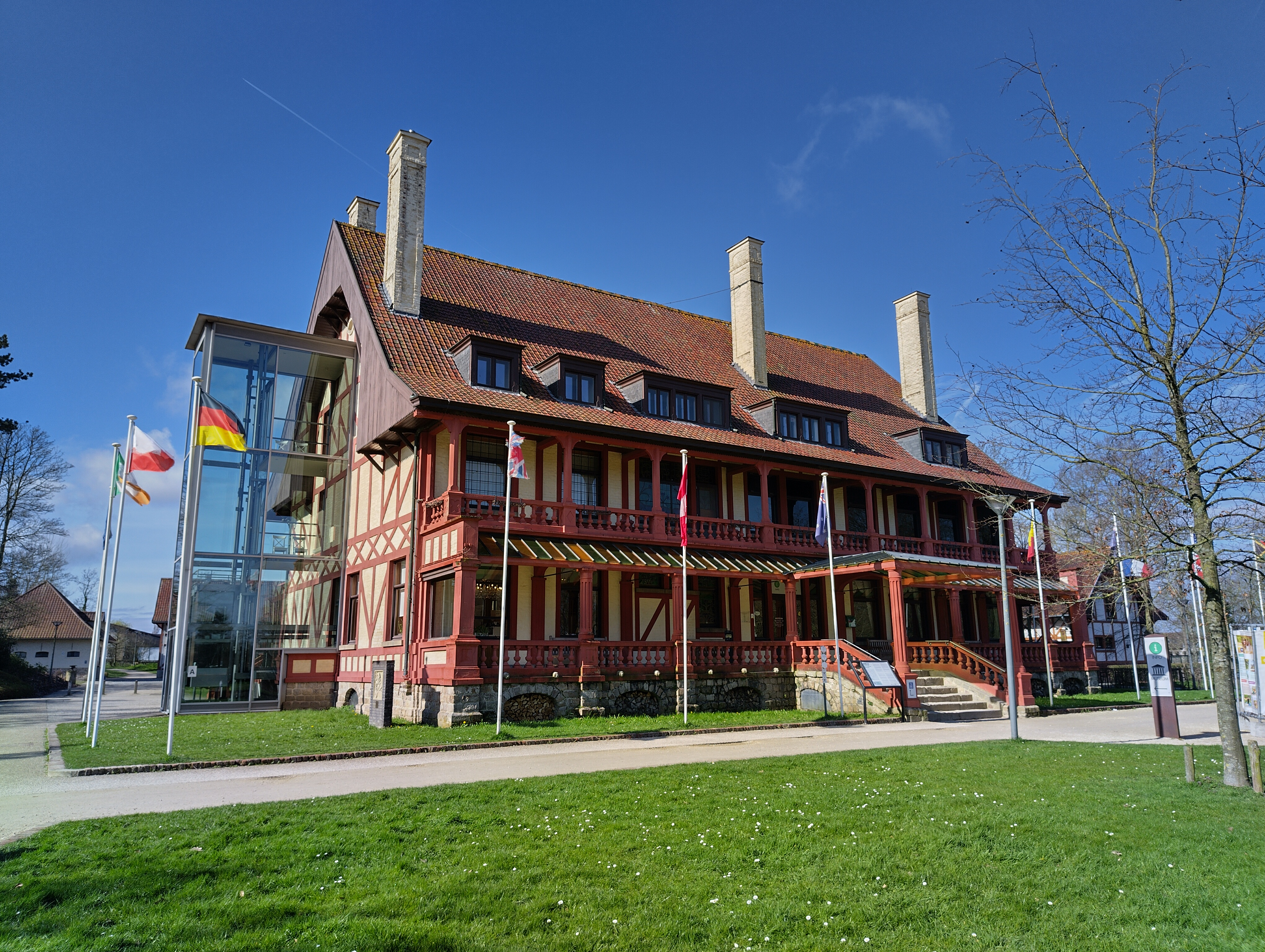
- Facade of the main building (2024)
- Former name: Memorial Museum Passchendaele 1917 (public name until 2022)
- Established: 2003; 23 years ago; Official opening: 23 April 2004
- Location: Berten Pilstraat 5A, Zonnebeke (Belgium)
- Coordinates: 50°52′15″N 2°59′19″E
- Type: Military museum
- Visitors: 107.035 (2025)
- Director: Debbie Manhaeve
- Chairperson: Joachim Jonckheere
- Public transit access: Bus stop: Zonnebeke Dorp
- Parking: On site (no charge)
- Website: passchendaele.be

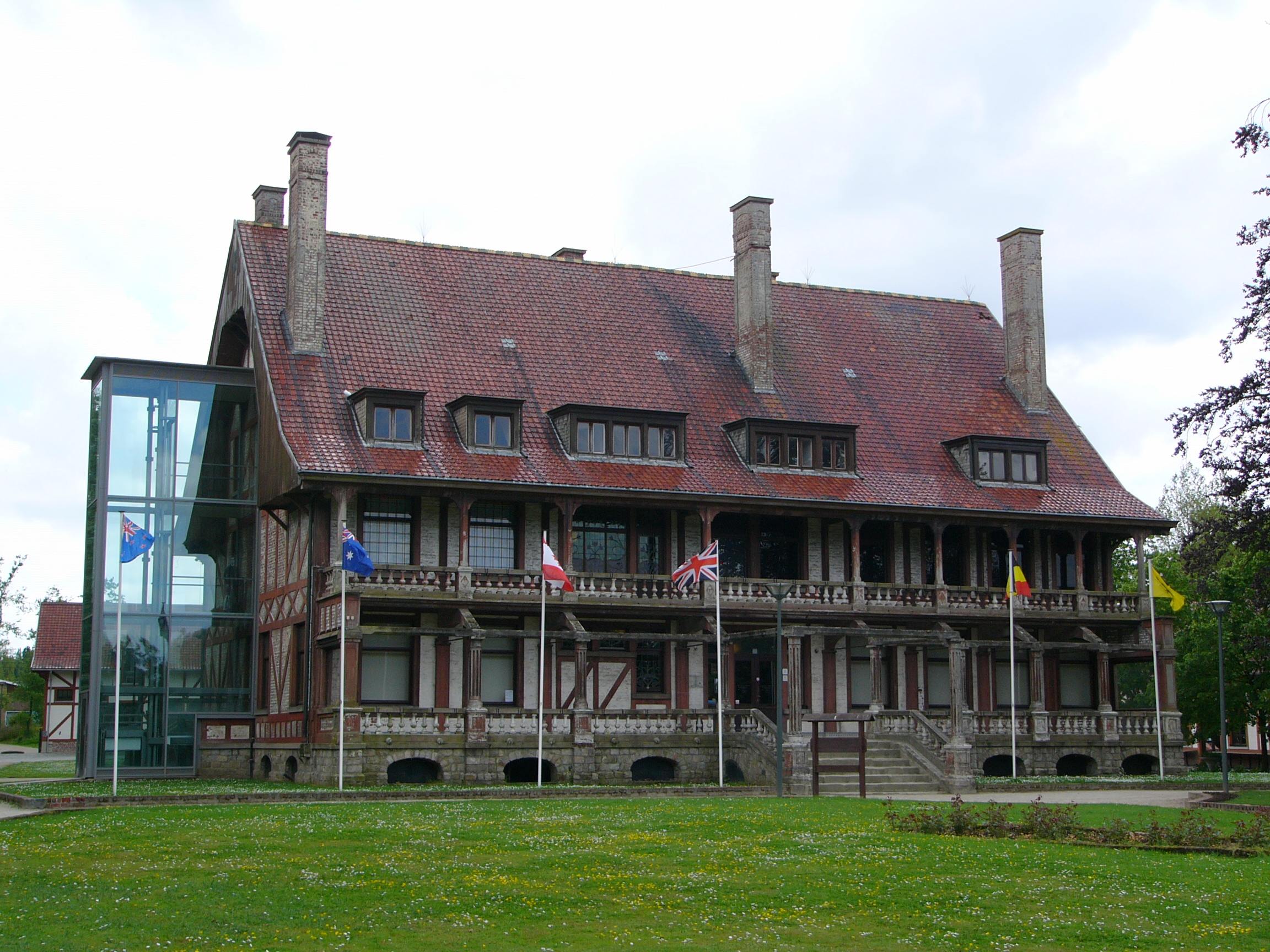
Main building before restoration (2009)

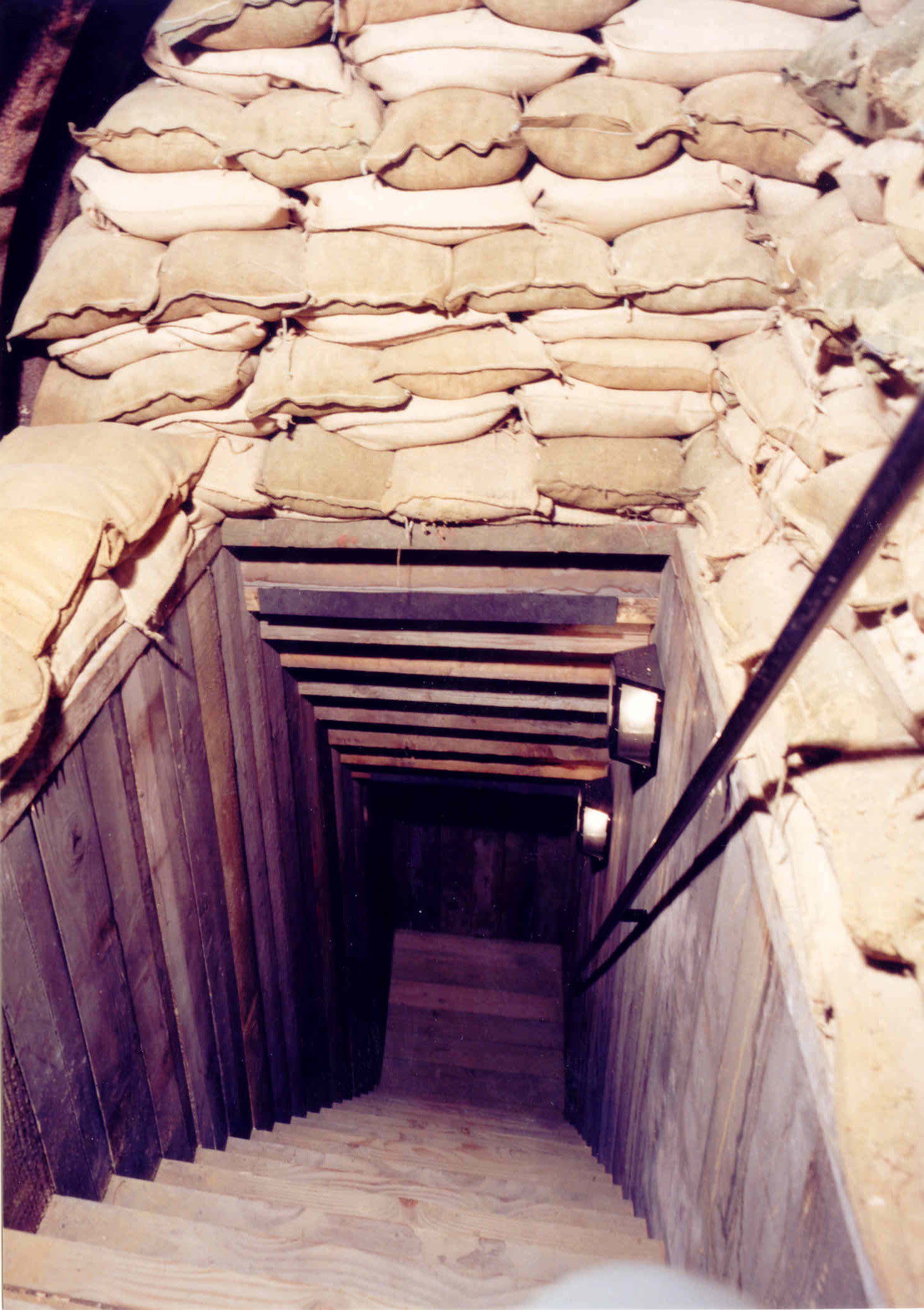
The dugout leads to a communication centre, a first-aid post, headquarters and beds for soldiers

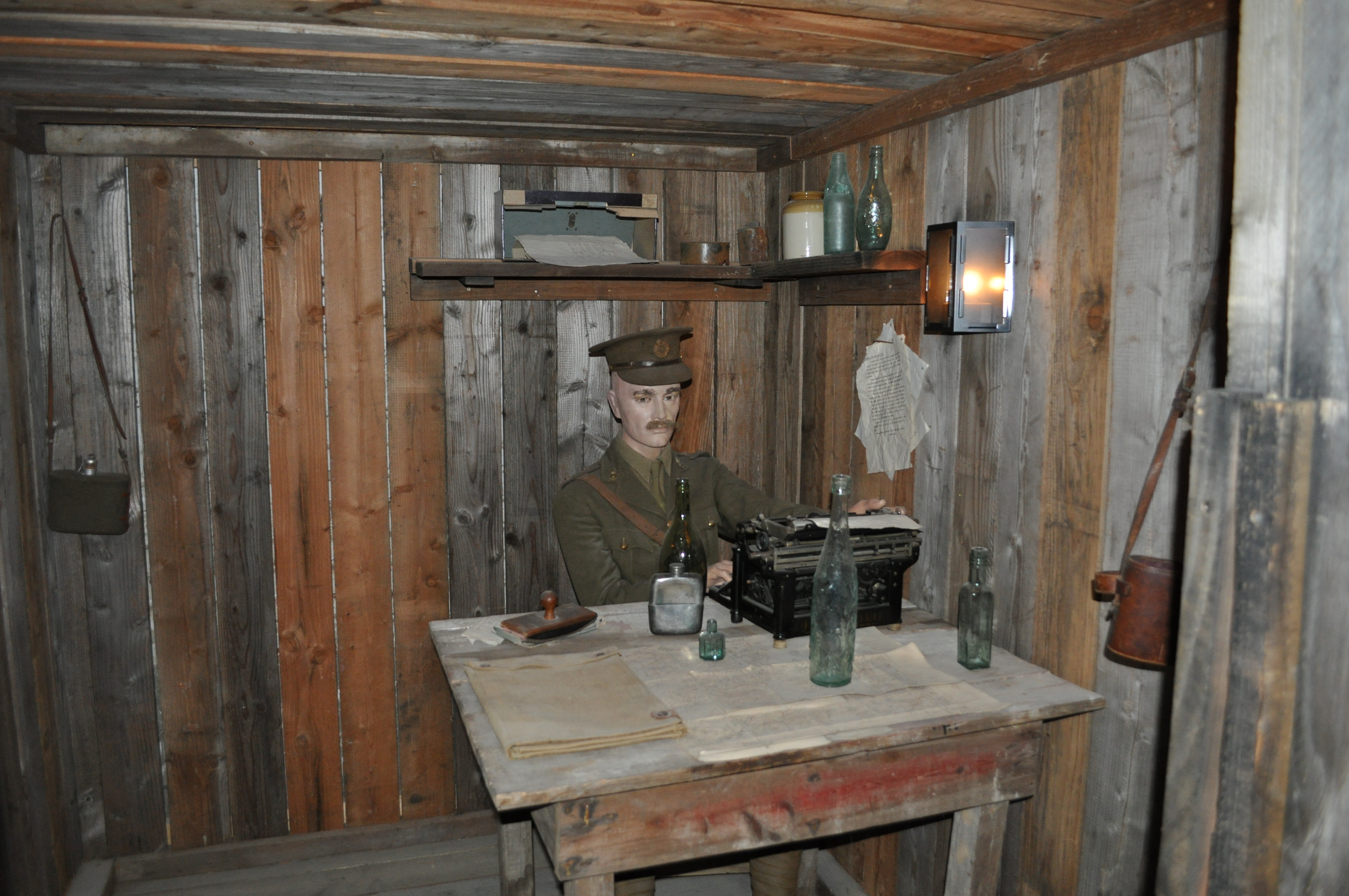
Officer at desk in dugout

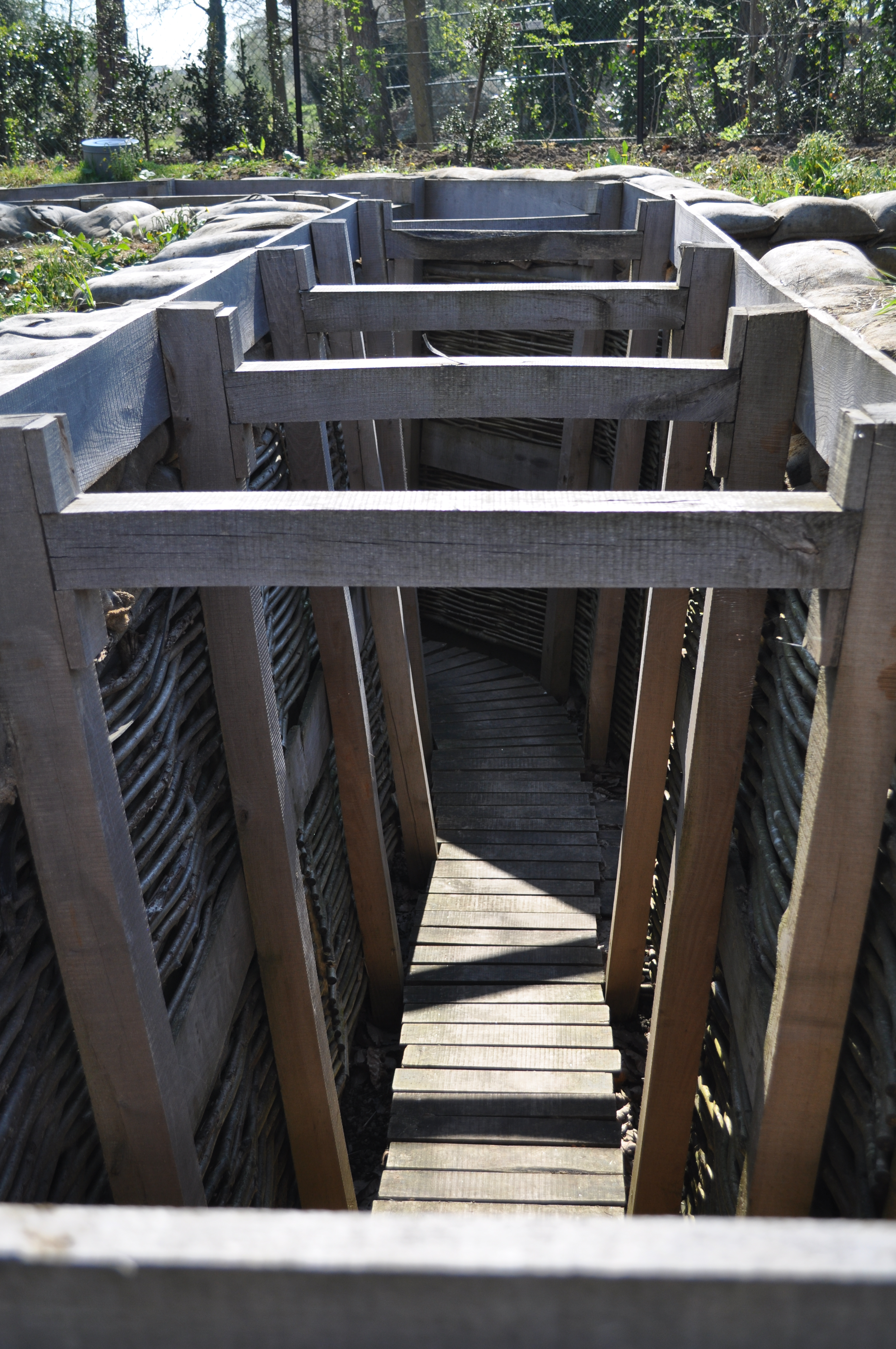
Trenches

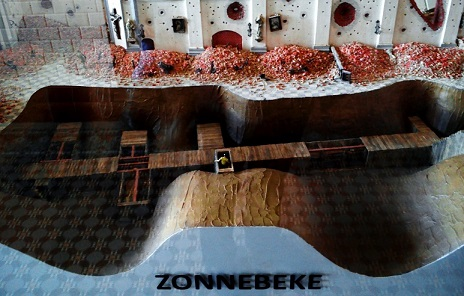
Model of the Zonnebeke Church Dugout, constructed by 171st Tunnelling Company

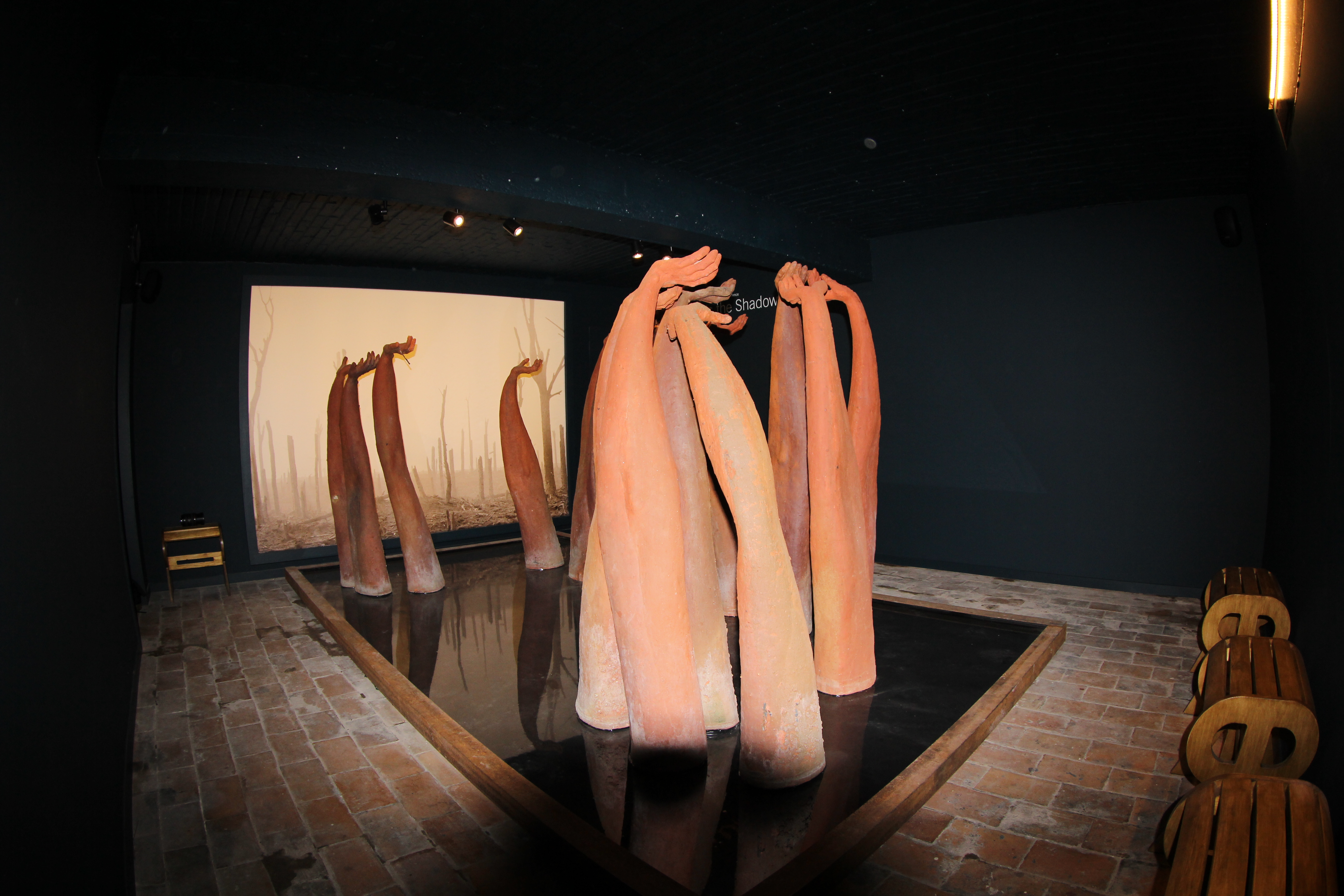
"Falls The Shadow" by Helen Pollock

The Passchendaele Museum (formerly the Memorial Museum Passchendaele 1917) is a military museum located in the chateau grounds of Zonnebeke, Belgium. It is dedicated to the First World War and in particular to the Battle of Passchendaele (also known as the Third Battle of Ypres, July–November 1917). A regional museum operating from 1989 to 2002 formed the basis for the current institution, which opened in 2004 as a dedicated First World War museum under the administration of the municipality of Zonnebeke. In 2014, the museum became an autonomous municipal company.

== History ==
The history of the Passchendaele Museum started in 1987. It featured the first exhibition about the Third Battle of Ypres (1917). This exhibition consisted of visual materials from the Imperial War Museum. This initial exhibition was considered successful, with 9,000 visitors, who attended, amongst other events, a large ceremony at Tyne Cot Cemetery and battlefield tours.

It was decided to put the château at the museum's disposal, with attention fixed on the war years, but also the Zonnebeke Augustinian Abbey and local history. The museum itself opened in 1989.

In 2002, it was decided to renew the museum. The museum was increased to three storeys and became a classic historical museum with a reconstructed dug-out being built. The renewed museum opened on Anzac Day 2004.

In 2007, during the commemoration of 90 years since the 'Third Battle of Ypres', the museum organised six thematic exhibitions that took place in different locations, along with creating three new trails.

In 2014, the former vicarage of Zonnebeke was restored to be used as research centre.

== Building and grounds ==
The Passchendaele Museum is located in the chateau grounds of Zonnebeke, situated on the archaeological site of the former Augustinian abbey of Zonnebeke, founded in the 12th century. The domain covers approximately 19 hectares and is located on Ieperstraat in the centre of Zonnebeke.

The current chateau, which now functions as the main museum building and the tourist office, was built around 1924 in a pseudo-Norman cottage style to a design by Bruges architect Théodore Raison, replacing the original pre-war building which was completely destroyed during the First World War.

== Passchendaele Research Centre ==
On 27 April 2014 the Passchendaele Museum opened a research centre in the former vicarage of Zonnebeke. The building houses an office for the museum's research staff, a library and reading room. The Passchendaele Research Centre is open to researchers and visitors with historical inquiries. The museum shares the building with the Zonnebeekse Heemvrienden, the local historical society.
