= Givenchy-lès-la-Bassée =

- Commune
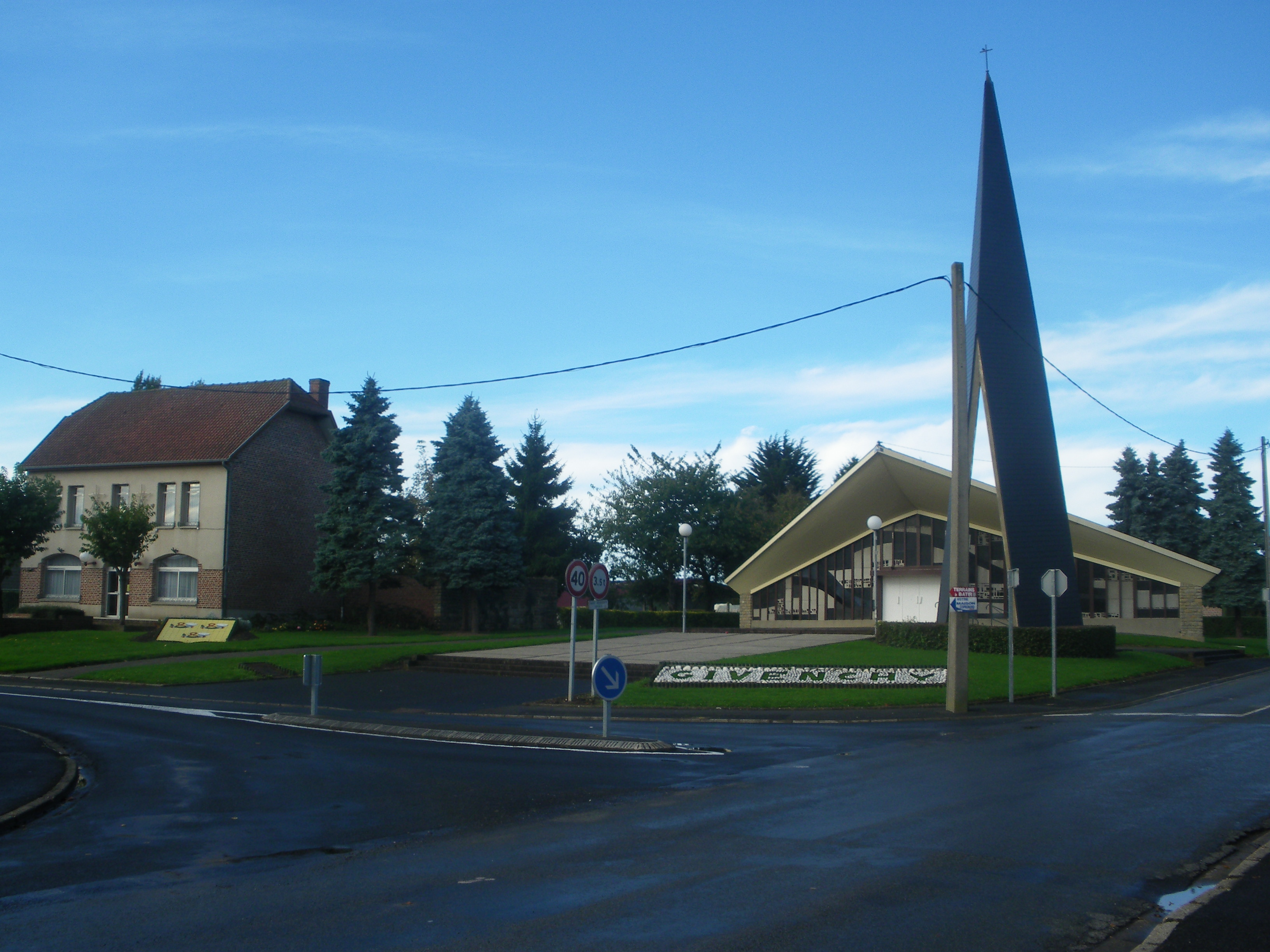
- The centre of Givenchy-lès-la-Bassée

- Coat of arms
- Location of Givenchy-lès-la-Bassée
- Location within France Location within Hauts-de-France
- Coordinates: 50°31′46″N 2°45′31″E
- Country: France
- Region: Hauts-de-France
- Department: Pas-de-Calais
- Arrondissement: Béthune
- Canton: Douvrin
- Intercommunality: CA Béthune-Bruay, Artois-Lys Romane

Government
  - Mayor (2022–2026): Emmanuel Herbaut
- Area^{1}: 3.89 km^{2} (1.50 sq mi)
- Elevation: 27 m (89 ft)
- Highest elevation: 31 m (102 ft)
- Lowest elevation: 19 m (62 ft)
- Population (2023): 982
  - Density: 252/km^{2} (654/sq mi)
- Time zone: UTC+01:00 (CET)
  - Summer (DST): UTC+02:00 (CEST)
- INSEE/Postal code: 62373 /62149
- ^{1} French Land Register data, which excludes lakes, ponds, glaciers > 1 km^{2} (0.386 sq mi or 247 acres) and river estuaries.

Givenchy-lès-la-Bassée (French pronunciation: [ʒivɑ̃ʃi lɛ la base], literally Givenchy near La Bassée; Picard: Givinchy-lès-l’Bassée) is a commune in the Pas-de-Calais department in the Hauts-de-France region of France.

== Geography ==
A farming village situated 4 kilometres (2.5 mi) west of La Bassée, 8 kilometres (5.0 mi) east of Béthune and 25 kilometres (16 mi) southwest of Lille, at the junction of the D166 and the D167 roads. The Canal d'Aire flows past the commune, forming its southern border.

== History ==
The village was first chronicled in the year 870 as "Juventiacum".

During the First World War, it was completely destroyed, as this was the only part of the entire front that withheld the force of the German offensive in the spring of 1918. The courageous stand of the 55th (West Lancashire) Division is commemorated by a memorial in the village. For much of the war, the village was an area of fierce underground warfare. In 1916, William Hackett was awarded the Victoria Cross for an action at Givenchy. The Tunnellers Memorial at Givenchy, unveiled on 19 June 2010, commemorates Hackett's action.

During the Second World War, at the time of the withdrawal of British troops towards Dunkirk, the school, mayor's office and the memorial village hall were again destroyed. After the devastation of that war, the citizens of Liverpool donated reading books and money to the town of Givenchy-les-la-Bassee. The town hall of Givenchy has a plaque on the front wall thanking the City of Liverpool for its kindness and support for the town.

In 2008, a small group of students from Liverpool went to Givenchy on behalf of the City of Liverpool on the 90th anniversary of the First World War. Finally, the community of Givenchy still to this day has meetings with Liverpool's Lord Mayor and unity between the two places are still strong

== Population ==
Historical population
Year	Pop.	±% p.a.
1968	521	—
1975	554	+0.88%
1982	748	+4.38%
1990	803	+0.89%
1999	813	+0.14%
2007	843	+0.45%
2012	998	+3.43%
2017	1,012	+0.28%
2023	982	−0.50%
Source: INSEE

== See also ==
- Communes of the Pas-de-Calais department
