= Territory of Western Samoa =

Western Samoa between 1920 and 1962

Territory of Western Samoa Teritori o Sāmoa i Sisifo (Samoan)
- 1920–1962
- Flag Coat of arms

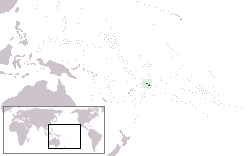
- Status: Class C League of Nations mandate of New Zealand (1920–1946); United Nations trust territory of New Zealand (1946–1962)
- Capital: Apia; 13°50′S 171°45′W
- Common languages: English (official); Samoan (native); Austronesian languages Papuan languages
- Monarch
  - 1920–1936: George V
  - 1936–1936: Edward VIII
  - 1936–1952: George VI
  - 1952–1962: Elizabeth II
- Administrator
  - 1914–1919: Robert Logan
  - 1919–1923: Robert Tate
  - 1923–1928: George Richardson
  - 1928–1931: Stephen Allen
  - 1931–1935: Herbert Hart
  - 1935–1946: Alfred Turnbull
  - 1960–1962: Jack Wright
- Historical era: British Empire
  - Occupation: 30 August 1914
  - Established: 17 December 1920
  - Trusteeship: 13 December 1946
  - Independence: 1 January 1962
- Currency: Pound sterling (1914–1930); New Zealand pound (1930–1962); Western Samoan pound (1930–67)
| Preceded by | Succeeded by |
| German Samoa | Western Samoa |
- Today part of: Samoa

The Territory of Western Samoa was the civil administration of Western Samoa by New Zealand between 1920 and Samoan independence in 1962. In 1914, German Samoa was captured by the Samoa Expeditionary Force shortly after the outbreak of World War I, and was formally annexed as a League of Nations mandate in 1920 in the Treaty of Versailles. It was later transformed into a United Nations Trust Territory following the dissolution of the League of Nations in 1946.

== History ==
=== Occupation of German Samoa in World War I ===
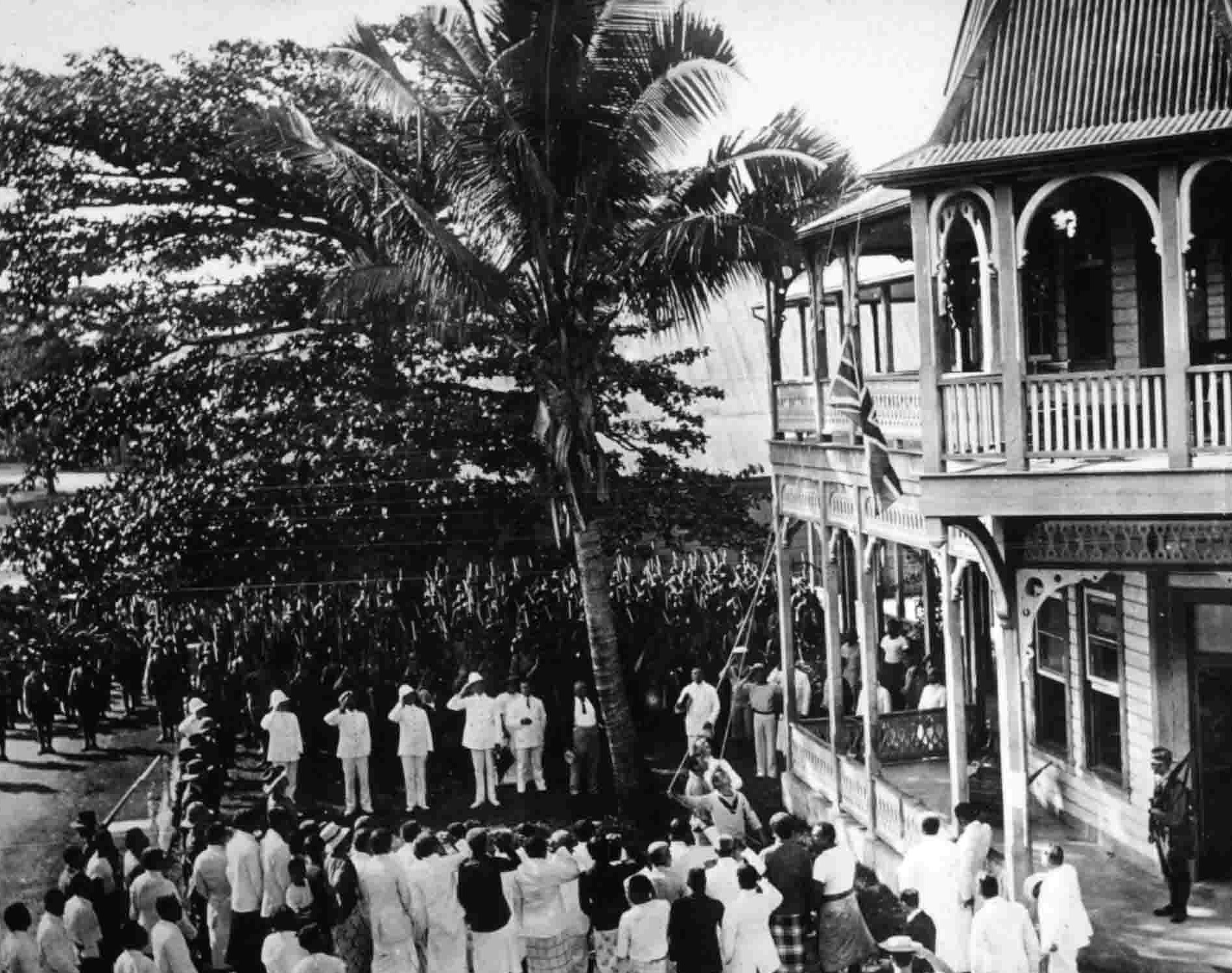
The Union Flag raised in Apia, 30 August 1914

At the outbreak of World War I German Samoa was a German colony. On August 7, 1914, the British government indicated to New Zealand (which was at this time a British dominion), that the seizure of a wireless station near Apia, the colony's capital which was used by the German East Asia Squadron, would be a "great and urgent Imperial service". This was followed by the first action of New Zealand in the war, the sailing of a Samoa Expeditionary Force on 15 August, which landed at Apia two weeks later. Although Germany refused to officially surrender the colonies, no resistance was offered and the occupation took place without any fighting. Despite claims that German Samoa was the first enemy territory to fall to imperial forces, the first seizure of a German colony had occurred four days earlier when Togoland was captured as part of the West Africa Campaign.

Colonel Robert Logan, who had commanded the Samoan Expeditionary Force, was the military administrator of the colony for the remainder of the war. By 1918, Samoa had a population of some 38,000 Samoans and 1,500 Europeans. Approximately one-fifth of the population died in the Influenza epidemic of 1918–1919. In 1919, The Royal Commission of Inquiry into the Epidemic concluded that there had been no epidemic of pneumonic influenza in Western Samoa before the arrival of the SS Talune from Auckland on 7 November 1918, which was allowed to berth by Logan without quarantine precautions. Within seven days of this ship's arrival influenza had become epidemic in Upolu and had then spread rapidly throughout the territory.

=== Mandate ===
On 17 December 1920, the League of Nations formally conferred a Class C Mandate over the former German Colony of Samoa to the Dominion of New Zealand. The mandate was supported by the Samoa Constitution Order, 1920, which had replaced the military occupation with a civil administration on 1 May 1920. On 1 April 1922, the Samoa Act 1921 came into force.

Under the Samoa Act the New Zealand Governor-General appointed an administrator based in Apia to hold executive power and to report to the New Zealand Minister of External Affairs in Wellington; lawmaking power was held by the administrator and a local legislative council, although Wellington had final authority. New Zealand administrators repressed freedom of media, freedom of association, and free speech on Western Samoa, as well as banished those who criticized New Zealand's rule.

After 1945, the classification of the mandate was changed to a United Nations Trust Territory.

=== From Mau protests to independence ===
The Mau (translates as "strongly held opinion") was a popular non-violent movement which had its beginnings in the early 1900s (decade) in Savai'i. It was first led by Lauaki Namulauulu Mamoe, an orator chief deposed by the German administration. The 1920s saw the resurgence of the Mau in opposition to the New Zealand administration. One of the Mau leaders was Olaf Frederick Nelson, a half Samoan and half Swedish merchant. Nelson was exiled by the administration during the late 1920s to the early 1930s, but he continued to assist the organisation financially and politically.

On 28 December 1929, the newly elected leader, high chief Tupua Tamasese Lealofi III, led his fellow uniformed Mau in a peaceful demonstration in downtown Apia. The New Zealand police attempted to arrest the high chief. When he resisted, a struggle occurred between the police and the Mau. The officers began to fire randomly into the crowd and a Lewis machine gun, mounted in preparation for this demonstration, was used to disperse the Mau. Chief Tamasese was shot from behind and killed while trying to bring calm and order to the Mau demonstrators, screaming "Peace, Samoa". Ten others died that day and approximately fifty were injured by gunshots and police batons.

That day would come to be known in Samoa as Black Saturday. The Mau grew, remaining steadfastly non-violent, and expanded to include a highly influential women's branch. After repeated efforts by the Samoan people, Western Samoa gained independence in 1962 and signed a Friendship Treaty with New Zealand. Samoa was the first country in the Pacific to become independent.

In 2002, New Zealand's prime minister Helen Clark, on a trip to Samoa, formally apologised for New Zealand's role in the banishment of Samoan leaders, the failure to quarantine SS Talune, and the Apia shootings.

== Notable people ==
- Afa Anoa'i, professional wrestler
