= New Zealand troopship magazines from World War I =

New Zealand troopship magazines from WWI

New Zealand troopship magazines were maritime publications from the First World War, written by NZEF soldiers on their way to or from Europe and the Middle East. They contained a combination of creative works and informational content, serving as both entertainment and souvenirs for soldiers. Modern scholars and heritage curators widely consider them as cultural artefacts depicting the emotions and experiences of soldiers who lived onboard New Zealand troopships during WWI.

== Historical background ==
=== NZEF enters WWI ===
When the first world war broke out in Europe in August 1914, the New Zealand Government formed the New Zealand Expeditionary Force (NZEF) as the country's arm of the British Military Forces. Due to the geographical distance and available technology of the time, transport via ships of the NZEF to the war was a necessity. The NZ government chartered merchant vessels from companies including the New Zealand Union Steamship Company and converted them into troopships. The first two New Zealand troopships set off in August 1914 carrying 1400 personnel to German Occupied Samoa as part of the Samoa Advance Force. This was followed with the departure of the NZEF Main Body and 1th Reinforcements in October of the same year from Wellington Harbour.Approximately 8,500 personnel and 4000 horses embarked to Europe and the Middle East on 10 charted troopships. It remains the largest single departure of New Zealanders from the country at one time. Over the duration of the war, almost 10,000 military personnel were transported to the conflict via 111 troopships charted by the New Zealand Government.

=== Troopship voyages ===
The journey from New Zealand to the war theatres of Europe and the Middle East took between four to ten weeks, depending on the route, weather and type of ship. Troopship magazines provided a source of onboard entertainment during these long voyages. There were three main routes to the conflict. Ships to Egypt, including the Main Body, typically crossed the Tasman Sea with ports of call at Hobart or Albany in Australia. They then crossed the Indian Ocean with a stopover in Colombo, Sri Lanka, before sailing through the Red Sea and disembarking at Suez or Alexandria. Reinforcement ships headed to Europe sailed to across the Tasman Sea to Cape Town, South Africa, before navigating the West Coast of Africa to England or France. Alternatively, a small number of ships sailed East across the Pacific and through the Panama Canal before heading to England. Sometimes the men onboard did not know which direction their ship was headed, for example, the 8th Observation of Sinbad in troopship no. 74 magazine 'Our Ark', notes gossip about the unknown destination of their ship amongst soldiers. The troopships travelled in convoys escorted by smaller navy vessels to deter German U boats.

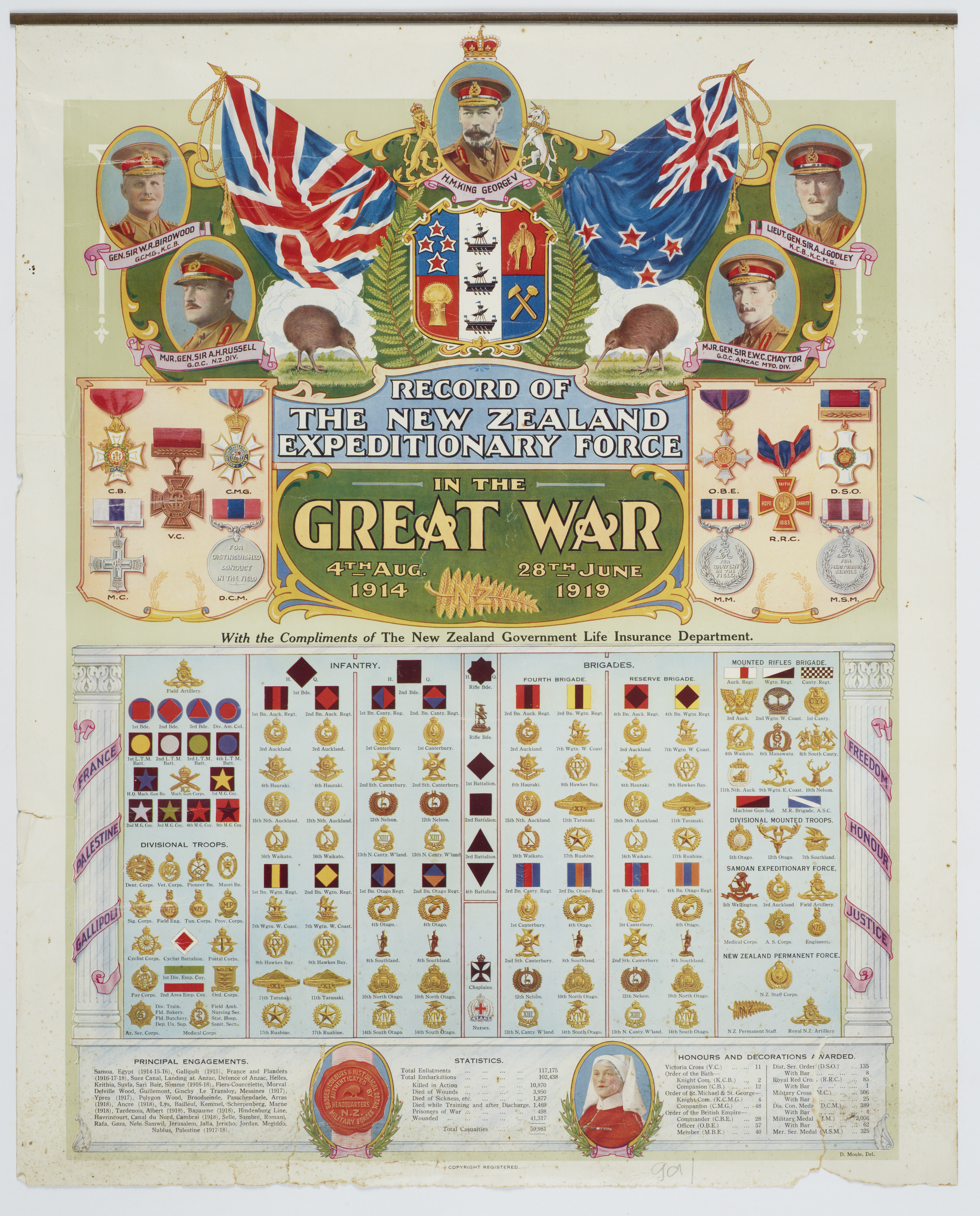
New Zealand Expeditionary Force poster from the First World War

== Magazine creation & description ==
As government sanctioned publications, every New Zealand troopship departing for or returning from the First World War produced a magazine. Publication dates range from 1914 to 1920.

=== Physical characteristics ===
The magazines were produced either onboard the ships or at ports of call such as Cape Town. Due to limited materials, onboard publications tended to be shorter, with sometimes as little as two pages per issue. Some publications were handwritten, while others were printed using compact presses normally used for menus and notices in peacetime. These magazines were physically smaller and contained limited illustrations. They were typically multi-issue, and were sold and circulated amongst the troops during the voyage. In contrast, magazines produced at ports were usually single-issue publications. These were generally longer and incorporated more varied typography. They often included illustrations, and occasionally coloured inks or photographs. The 1918 Transport no.102 troopship magazine The Port Light, for example, was 48 pages with a blue ink cover. Overall, the quality of the magazines improved as the war progressed.

=== Authors ===
The editorial experience of the magazines' authors and illustrators varied. Calls for contributions were added into daily ship orders, and later incorporated into onboard publications.While contributions were made across all military ranks, approximately 44% came from non-commissioned officers (NCOs), which reflected their operational roles as administrators, secretaries and sub-editors. Most contributions were written by Pākehā men aged between 19 and 45, representing the dominant demographic of the New Zealand Expeditionary Force during the war.

=== Titles ===
Magazine titles were often wordplays on the troopship's name, number, or reinforcement group. The 1915 Transport No. 18 magazine, The Pip: The Official Journal of The Tired Third, for example, referenced the ship's role in the NZEF's 3rd Reinforcement. Similarly, the 1919 troopship magazine Kai-Courier was named after the HMT Kaikoura, a ship which transported returning soldiers back to New Zealand after the war.

=== Modern Collections ===
The collection of New Zealand troopship magazines began in 1915, when Dunedin City Librarian W. B. McEwan recognised their cultural significance and requested donations to the Dunedin Public Libraries. Of the 111 First World War troopships, 88 magazine publications have been identified and the library currently holds 379 volumes. In collaboration with Auckland Museum, Dunedin Public Libraries digitised and made publicly available all magazines in its collection, available through the Auckland Museum Collections Online database.

== Magazine content & purpose ==
Troopship magazines served multiple roles during the First World War, combining entertainment, documentation, and practical information for soldiers through a mixture of creative and informative content.

=== Creative content ===
Creative works provided soldiers with onboard entertainment to alleviate boredom, as well as an outlet for frustrations with life at sea.These contributions included short stories, plays, poems as well cartoon illustrations depicting political figures and military command. Well-known songs of the era were also frequently reproduced with adapted lyrics reflecting the soldiers' experiences and annoyances.

Below is an example song exert from page two of The Tired Third magazine, titled The Trooper's Song:

"On the troopship O my darling / When the "Lights Out" call has gone / When the breeze from distant islets / Breathes across me sad and lone. / When the cockroach and the spider / Rustle gently through my hair / Then I dream of you my darling / And I think it hardly fair," (lines 1-8).

=== Factual content ===
Factual material was also a significant component. Outcomes of sports matches, accounts of adventures at ports of call, and onboard concert lineups contributed to the editors' aim of developing the magazines as souvenirs of the voyage. Many soldiers kept their copies as keepsakes of their time at sea. Single-issue magazines also typically contained nominal rolls and contact details in their final pages, functioning not only as souvenirs but as a means for soldiers to stay in contact throughout the war. Other content served practical purposes, including wireless reports about the war, news from New Zealand, or maritime weather.

=== Contemporary analysis ===
According to modern interpreters, the magazines share an emboldened and often witty tone across the different content genres. Recent scholarship and heritage-institution publications emphasise this ship humour as a means of maintaining morale, as well as fostering a community spirit and camaraderie among the troops during the lengthy and uncertain voyages of the First World War.
