= Francis William Voelcker =

Samoan politician

Francis William Voelcker CBE DSO MC
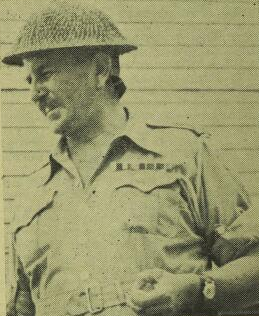

High Commissioner of Western Samoa
- In office 1948–1949
- Succeeded by: Guy Powles

Administrator of Western Samoa
- In office 1946–1948
- Preceded by: Alfred Turnbull

Personal details
- Born: 9 October 1896 London, United Kingdom
- Died: 22 May 1954 (aged 57) Auckland, New Zealand

Lieutenant-Colonel Francis William Voelcker CBE DSO MC (9 October 1896 – 22 May 1954) was a British army officer and colonial administrator.

== Biography ==
Born in London in 1896, Voelcker attended Shrewsbury School before joining the Royal Military College, Sandhurst in 1914. After the outbreak of World War I he was assigned to the King's Shropshire Light Infantry and went to fight in Belgium in 1915, where he was taken prisoner by the German army. During his three-and-a-half years as a POW, he escaped from three camps.

After the war he was awarded the Military Cross. He continued his military service, initially serving in Ireland in 1919, before going to Aden. He was subsequently transferred to India in 1921. Whilst there he married Norah Hodgson in 1924, with whom he had two daughters.

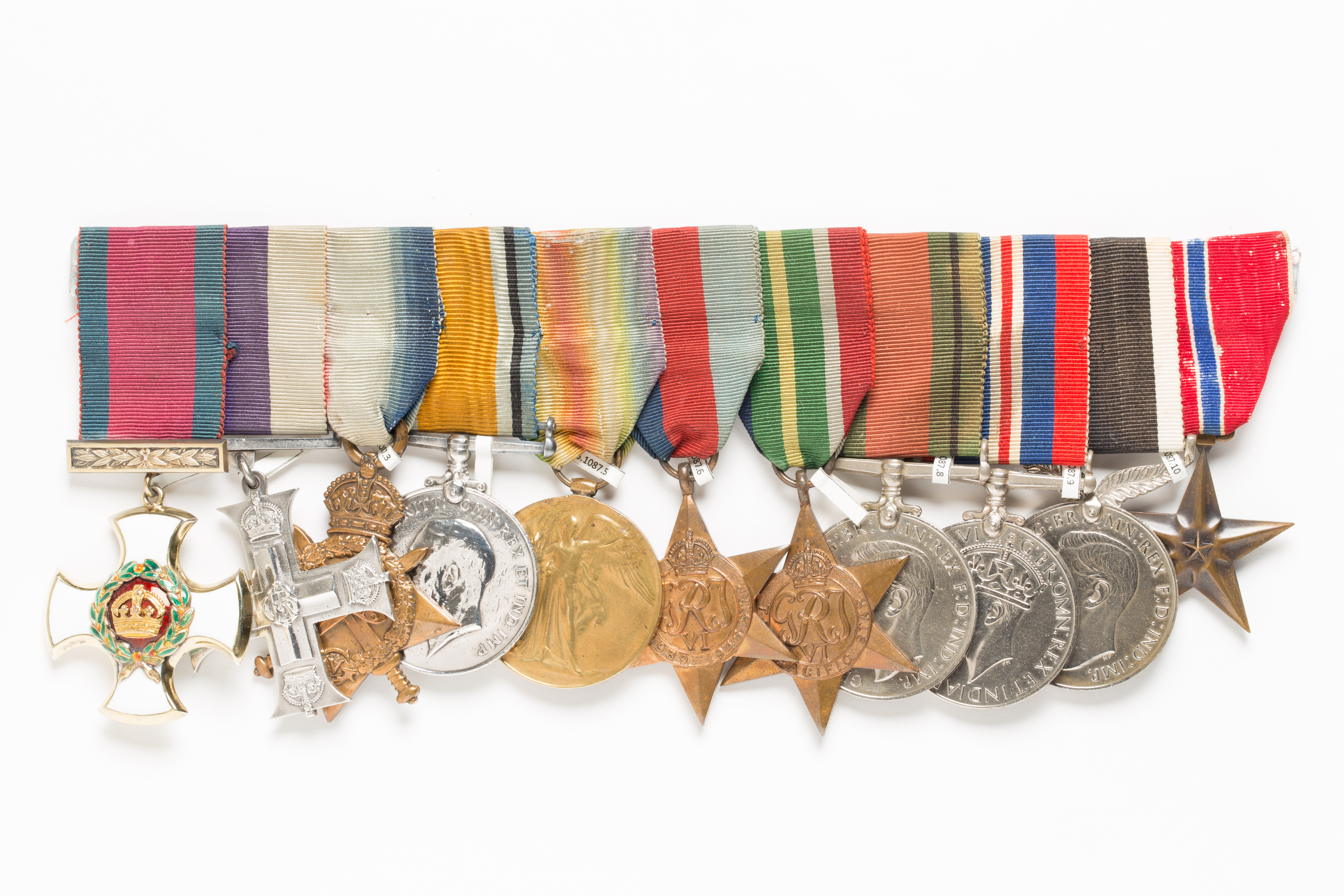
Voelcker's military medals

In 1928 he left the army and moved to New Zealand, settling in Kerikeri, where he grew citrus fruits. However, during World War II he re-entered military service with the New Zealand Military Forces, commanding the 34th Battalion for a time. He subsequently commanded the Third Battalion, Fiji Regiment during the Solomon Islands campaign. He was awarded the Bronze Star Medal by the United States in 1944 for his actions during the campaign, and was later given the Distinguished Service Order.

In 1946 he was appointed Administrator of Western Samoa. Following constitutional amendments, he became High Commissioner two years later. He was made a CBE in the 1949 Birthday Honours, before stepping down in 1949. After returning to New Zealand, he served in Korea as part of the United Nations Korean Reconstruction Agency until being invalided in 1953.

He died at his home in Auckland on 22 May 1954 at the age of 58.
