= Alfred Turnbull =

New Zealand military personnel (1881–1962)

Sir Alfred Turnbull KBE
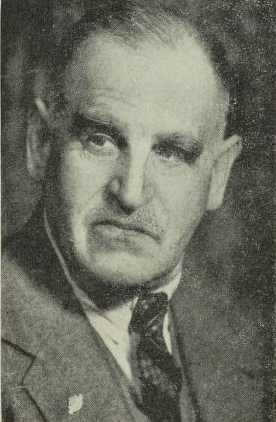

Administrator of Western Samoa and Tokelau
- In office 1935–1946
- Preceded by: Herbert Ernest Hart
- Succeeded by: Francis William Voelcker

Personal details
- Born: Alfred Clarke Turnbull; 14 October 1881 Balclutha, New Zealand
- Died: 17 September 1962 (aged 80) Stamford, Connecticut, United States
- Occupation: Public servant

Sir Alfred Clarke Turnbull KBE (14 October 1881 – 17 September 1962) was a New Zealand colonial administrator who served as Administrator of Western Samoa and Tokelau between 1935 and 1946.

== Biography ==
Alfred Turnbull was born in Balclutha in 1881, and was educated at Balclutha District High School. He joined the civil service in 1899, initially working in the Lands & Survey Department, before becoming Chief Accountant in 1912 and an inspector in 1915. He served in the New Zealand Expeditionary Force between 1916 and 1919. When he returned from the war, he was appointed secretary to the Public Service Commissioner. In 1921 he married Grace Moncrieff.

Turnbull was posted to Western Samoa in 1930, initially as Government Secretary. In 1935 he was appointed Acting Administrator, succeeding Herbert Ernest Hart. Turnbull was a popular figure in Samoa, and a petition was sent to the New Zealand government requesting his appointment. However, his position was not made permanent until 1943. He remained in office until 1946, when he retired and was replaced by Francis William Voelcker. The Samoan Offenders Ordinance was repealed by the Labour government while he was administrator and this recognised the Mau movement as a legal political organisation. Turnbull was appointed a Knight Commander of the Order of the British Empire in the 1946 New Year Honours.

Following Turnbull's retirement, he relocated to the United States where his daughter lived. He died in Stamford Hospital, Connecticut, in 1962.
