= List of colonial governors of Samoa =

Colonial governor of Samoa
- Reichskolonialflagge

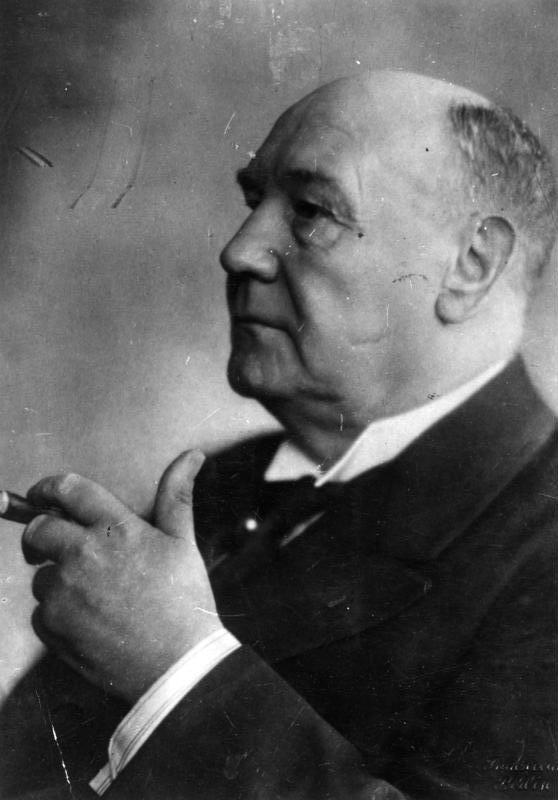
- Longest serving Wilhelm Heinrich Solf; 1 March 1900–19 December 1911
- German Samoa
- Formation: 1 March 1900
- First holder: Wilhelm Heinrich Solf
- Final holder: Jack Wright
- Abolished: 31 December 1961
- Succession: O le Ao o le Malo

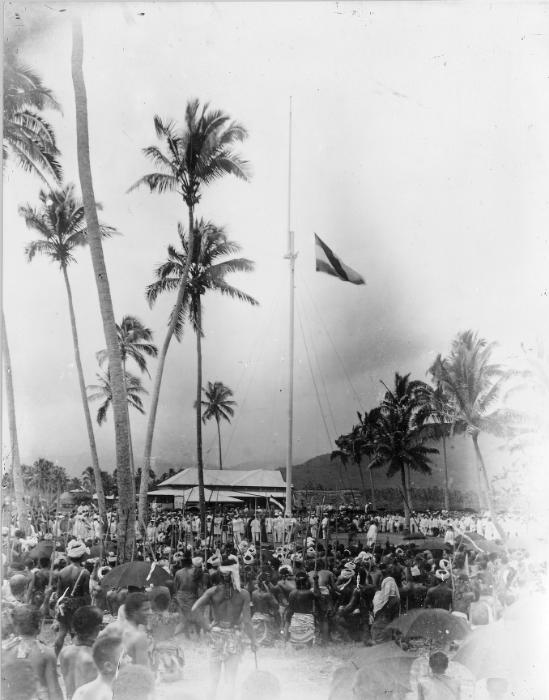
Hoisting the German flag at Mulinuʻu, Upolu on 1 March 1900.

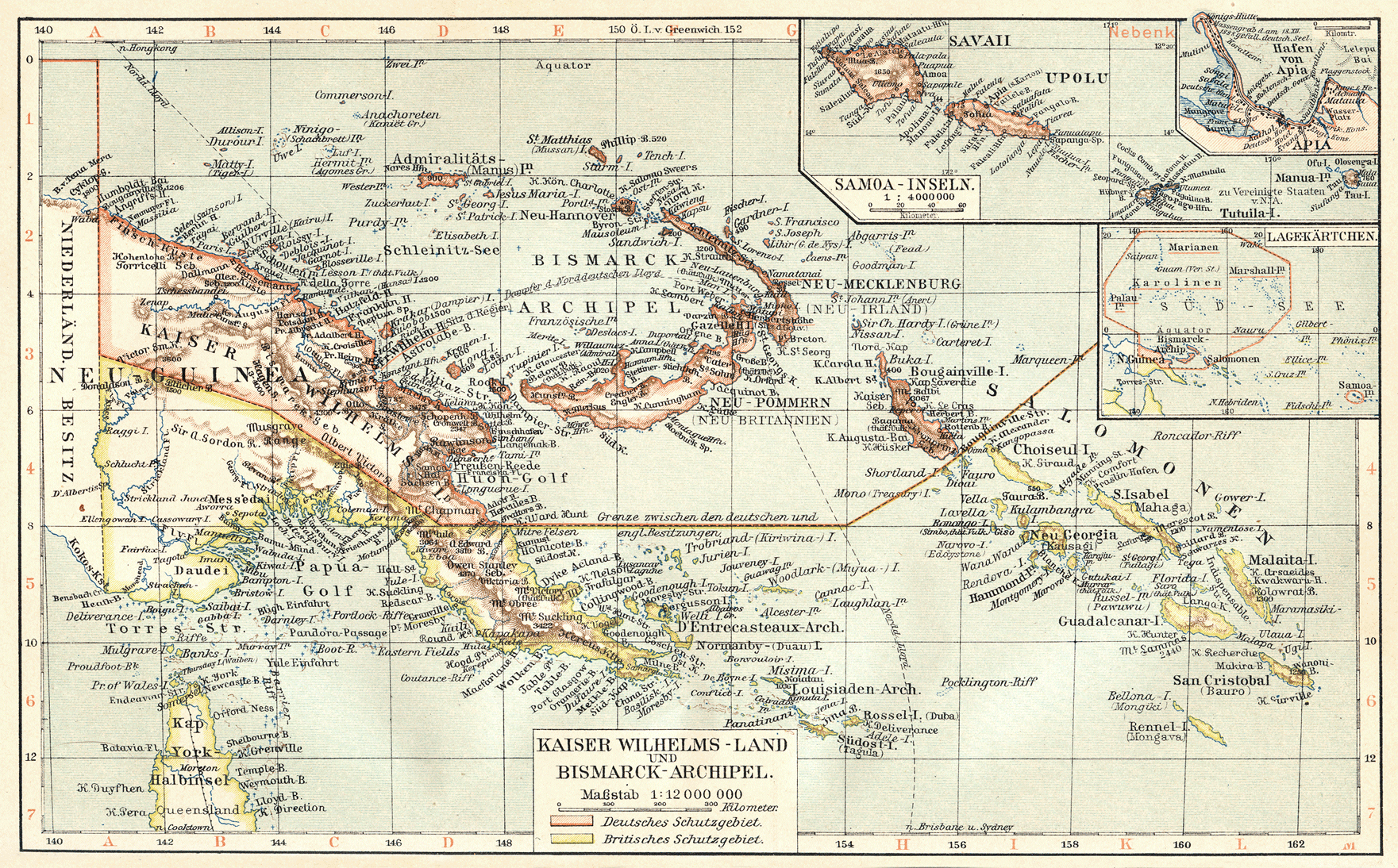
Kaiser-Wilhelmsland, the Bismarck Archipelago and the Samoan Islands (bordered in red), 1905.

The German colonial empire in the Pacific Ocean. German Samoa is shown in red.

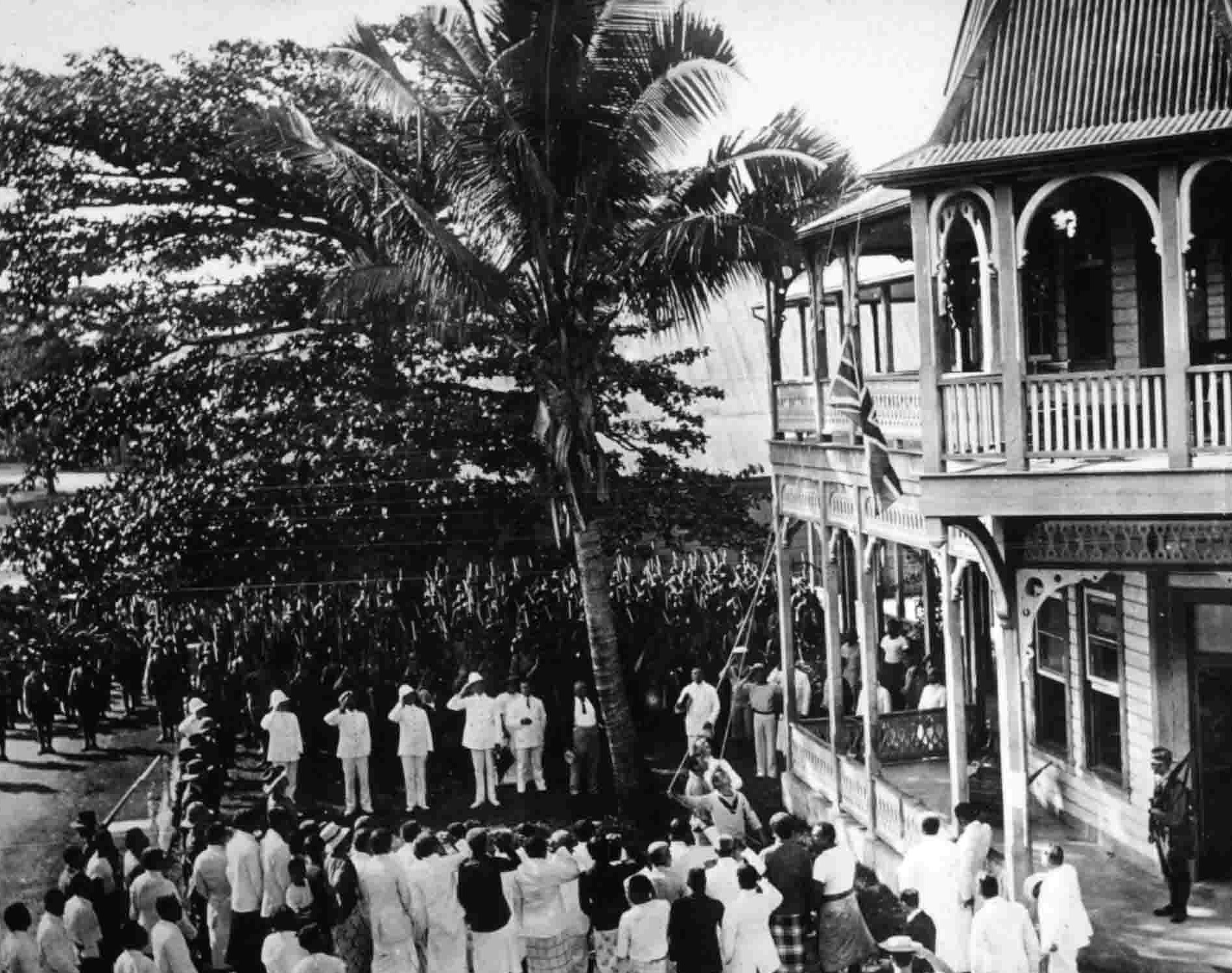
Hoisting the Union Jack at Apia, Upolu on 30 August 1914.

Flag of the governor of the Western Samoa Trust Territory.

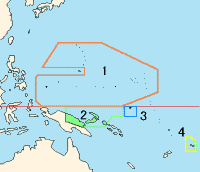
League of Nations mandates in the Pacific Ocean. The Western Samoa Trust Territory (bordered in yellow) is number 4.

This article lists the colonial governors of Samoa (or Western Samoa), from the establishment of German Samoa in 1900 until the independence of the Territory of Western Samoa in 1962.

== List ==
(Dates in italics indicate de facto continuation of office)

Tenure	Portrait	Incumbent	Notes
In 1900, according to the Tripartite Convention and following the Second Samoan Civil War, the Samoan Islands were annexed by the German Empire, except for the part that is to become American Samoa. Wilhelm II, the German Emperor, is styled "Tupu Sili o Samoa" ("Paramount King of Samoa").
Governors of German Samoa (1900–1914)
1 March 1900 to 19 December 1911		Wilhelm Heinrich Solf	Afterwards served as the Secretary of State in the Reichskolonialamt, from 1911 to 1918
19 December 1911 to 29 August 1914		Erich Schultz-Ewerth	Acting to 19 June 1912
In 1914, as part of the Asian and Pacific theatre of World War I, an expeditionary force from the Dominion of New Zealand called the Samoa Expeditionary Force (SEF) captured and occupied the territory. In 1920, the territory was turned into a League of Nations mandate, administered by New Zealand. In 1946, the mandate was reformed as a United Nations trust territory and continued to be administered by New Zealand.
Administrators of Western Samoa (1914–1948)
29 August 1914 to 28 January 1919		Colonel Robert Logan	
28 January 1919 to 16 March 1923		Colonel Robert Ward Tate	
16 March 1923 to 8 April 1928		George Spafford Richardson	From 3 June 1925, Sir George Spafford Richardson
5 May 1928 to 3 April 1931		Stephen Allen	
18 April 1931 to 25 July 1935		Herbert Ernest Hart	
25 July 1935 to 28 February 1946		Alfred Turnbull	From 1942, Sir Alfred Clarke Turnbull; acting to 1943
March 1946 to 10 March 1948		Francis William Voelcker	
High Commissioners of Western Samoa (1948–1961)
10 March 1948 to 23 February 1949		Francis William Voelcker	
1 March 1949 to 2 April 1960		Guy Powles	
2 April 1960 to 31 December 1961		Jack Wright	Acting to June 1960

On 1 January 1962, Western Samoa achieved independence following the passage of the 1961 referendum. For a list of heads of state after independence, see O le Ao o le Malo.

== See also ==
- Samoa
  - Politics of Samoa
  - O le Ao o le Malo
  - Prime Minister of Samoa
- Lists of office-holders
- New Zealand–Samoa relations
