= George Spafford Richardson =

Senior officer in the New Zealand Military Forces

Major-General Sir George Spafford Richardson KBE CB CMG
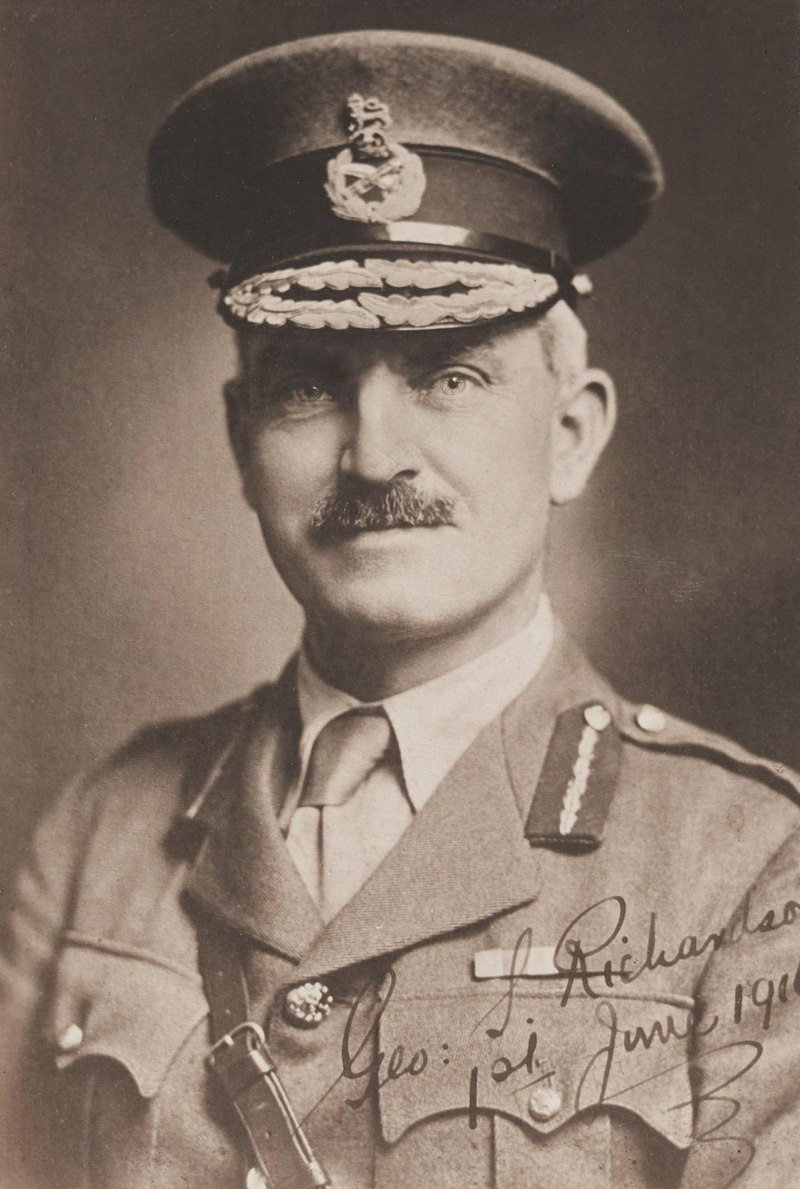
- Richardson, in the uniform of a brigadier general

7th Deputy Mayor of Auckland
- In office 11 May 1938 – 11 June 1938
- Mayor: Ernest Davis
- Preceded by: Bernard Martin
- Succeeded by: John Allum

3rd Administrator of Western Samoa
- In office 16 March 1923 – 8 April 1928
- Monarch: George V
- Preceded by: Robert Ward Tate
- Succeeded by: Stephen Allen

Personal details
- Born: 14 November 1868 Northamptonshire, England,
- Died: 11 June 1938 (aged 69) Auckland, New Zealand
- Awards: Knight Commander of the Order of the British Empire; Companion of the Order of the Bath; Companion of the Order of St Michael and St George; Mentioned in Despatches (3); Chavalier of the Legion of Honour (France); Croix de Guerre (Belgium)

Military service
- Allegiance: United Kingdom; New Zealand
- Branch/service: British Army; New Zealand Military Forces
- Years of service: 1886–1928
- Rank: Major-General
- Commands: New Zealand Expeditionary Force
- Battles/wars: First World War; Siege of Antwerp; Gallipoli campaign

Major-General Sir George Spafford Richardson, KBE, CB, CMG (14 November 1868 – 11 June 1938) was a senior officer in the New Zealand Military Forces.

Born in Northamptonshire, England, Richardson originally served with the British Army's Royal Regiment of Artillery as a non-commissioned officer before being transferred to New Zealand to instruct artillery units there. He eventually resigned from the British Army and was commissioned an officer in New Zealand's military. He was in London at the time of the outbreak of the First World War and served in the Siege of Antwerp and the Gallipoli Campaign with the Royal Naval Division. He then transferred to the New Zealand Expeditionary Force and served as its administrator in the United Kingdom. He continued to serve in the military until his retirement with the rank of major general.

In March 1923, he was appointed Administrator of Western Samoa and served in this capacity for five years. Towards the end of his time in Samoa, he ineffectually dealt with increasing civil unrest in the country. Retiring in 1928, he returned to New Zealand and became involved in local body politics in Auckland until his death in 1938.

== Early life ==
George Spafford Richardson was born in Northamptonshire, England, on 14 November 1868, the illegitimate son of a farmer, George Richardson, and Mary Ann Baxter. After a brief period in the workforce, he enlisted in the British Army's Royal Regiment of Artillery in 1886 for a 21-year term of engagement.

== Military career ==
Richardson trained at the Shoeburyness Gunnery School before being posted to Gibraltar where he served for four years. By 1891, he was a non-commissioned officer with the rank of staff sergeant instructor in gunnery and the same year, he was seconded to the New Zealand Permanent Forces, at the time the official title for the military forces of New Zealand. He began his four-year term as a gunnery instructor in New Zealand with the rank of master gunner.

Based in Wellington, he was well regarded by his superior officers. He was an innovative trainer, developing several inventions to better enable his work in instructing artillery personnel. His secondment was extended several times, a situation Richardson was comfortable with as he enjoyed life in New Zealand. He married Caroline Warren on 29 October 1892, and the couple would go on to have six children.

In 1907, Richardson, still in New Zealand, completed his original term of enlistment of 21 years with the British Army. He was immediately commissioned as a captain in the New Zealand Permanent Forces, becoming its Director of Artillery. In 1911, following the reorganisation of the New Zealand Permanent Forces into the New Zealand Military Forces, Richardson was transferred to the newly established New Zealand Staff Corps, still in the rank of captain. He was promoted to major the following year and returned to the United Kingdom in order to attend the Staff College in Camberley. While he was overseas, a son, also in the New Zealand Military Forces, was killed in an accident.

=== First World War ===
Richardson was serving on the Imperial General Staff in London as New Zealand's representative, having taken over Colonel Alfred Robin in this capacity, when the First World War broke out. He helped in the formation of the Royal Naval Division and deployed to France in September 1914 as its chief of staff, and then as assistant adjutant and quartermaster general with the temporary rank of lieutenant colonel. With the division, he served in the unsuccessful defence of Antwerp, and managed to avoid being taken prisoner of war when the city fell to the Germans.

Returning to England in November 1914 and still with the Royal Naval Division, Richardson helped prepare it for the Gallipoli Campaign and landed at Gallipoli on 25 April 1915. His work as a staff officer throughout the campaign was so highly regarded that he was promoted to temporary brigadier general and appointed deputy adjutant and quartermaster general of the British XII Corps. In October 1915, he was appointed a Companion of the Order of St Michael and St George. He served in Salonika with XII Corps as part of the British Salonika Army from December 1915 to February 1916. In recognition of his service at Gallipoli and Salonika, he was awarded the Croix de Chevalier of the Légion d'honneur (Legion of Honour) in March 1916. This French award is uncommon to New Zealanders with fewer than 100 awards made, and Richardson was one of only 14 members of the New Zealand Military Forces to be decorated with the Legion of Honour during the war.

At the request of the New Zealand Government, in February 1916 Richardson returned to England to become the New Zealand representative at the War Office. Transferring to the New Zealand Expeditionary Force (NZEF), he also took responsibility for its administration. His responsibilities extended to the overall command of all NZEF personnel in the United Kingdom. This included wounded personnel receiving medical treatment, nurses and doctors, as well as soldiers undergoing training before being transferred to the front. The overall commander of the NZEF, Lieutenant General Alexander Godley, thought highly of Richardson's work and it was recognised in the June 1917 Birthday Honours with his appointment as a Companion of the Order of the Bath.

Shortly after the cessation of hostilities Richardson was made a Commander of the Order of the British Empire in the 1919 New Year Honours. He had also been mentioned in despatches on three occasions during the course of the war.

== Postwar career ==
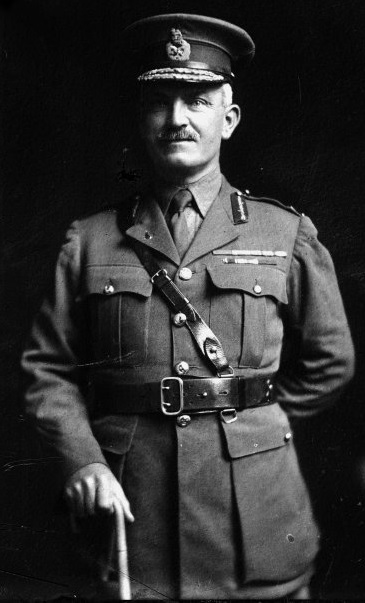
Richardson in 1920

Richardson returned to New Zealand in February 1919 and, based in Wellington, became administrator for General Headquarters of the New Zealand Military Forces. He also chaired the Reconstruction Committee which was established to reduce the New Zealand Military Forces to a peacetime setting. However, he soon tired of this work and the following year tendered his resignation. It was not accepted by the New Zealand Government and he remained in his role until early 1923. He was awarded the Belgian Croix de Guerre in 1922 for his services in the First World War, and also wrote a chapter on the education of soldiers, a subject in which he was particularly interested, for one of the volumes of the Official History of New Zealand's Effort in the Great War. This was published in 1923.

=== Western Samoa ===
In March 1923, Richardson was appointed Administrator of Western Samoa, a former possession of Imperial Germany but now a League of Nations mandate for which New Zealand was responsible on behalf of the League of Nations. This effectively ended his military career but not before he received a final promotion to major general.

Richardson met with some initial success in his new role, learning Samoan and implementing a number of reforms. He focussed on transforming the country's economy into one based upon agriculture with a long-term view of Samoan self-governance, and also implemented welfare and educational programs. His results were such that his term of three years in Western Samoa was extended by a further two years. He was knighted as a Knight Commander of the Order of the British Empire, in the 1925 King's Birthday Honours. However, over the next two years he had to deal with the increasing influence of the Mau movement, a nationalist group agitating for independence from New Zealand via peaceful means. Although Richardson was successful in implementing reform, he was ignorant of Samoan culture and political tradition and dismissive of Samoan activism. He believed that the realm of politics was only suitable for Europeans, on account of it being "a simple matter to upset a Native race".

Prior to Richardson's appointment, there had been considerable intermingling on the Samoan islands and there was a sizeable biracial population. Under his administration, European settlers were not allowed to interact with the Samoan population. This prompted criticism from both the European residents and Samoans. He was also criticised for his intrusive policies – he repressed freedom of media, freedom of association, and free speech on the Samoan islands. He arrested and banished individuals who criticised his rule.

Once the Mau movement gained momentum, Richardson took a heavy-handed approach to asserting his authority and deported several leaders of the Mau. This did not have the desired effect and dissent amongst the general population towards the New Zealand administration only increased. Richardson was forced to call in marines from the New Zealand Division of the Royal Navy to deal with the civil unrest. Shortly afterwards, on 31 March 1928, he retired. Later in the year, he was the New Zealand representative to the League of Nations meeting which discussed the administration of Western Samoa.

== Later life ==
Retiring to the city of Auckland, he was an advocate for returned servicemen, particularly those who were disabled, leading him to become involved politically. In the lead up to the 1931 election he was selected by the Reform Party to contest the seat of Auckland East. However, after a coalition was announced between the Reform Party and the governing United Party Richardson withdrew his candidacy in favour of the incumbent United Member of Parliament, James Donald. He then entered local body politics and became a member of the Auckland City Council (ACC) at the 1935 local elections. Voted again onto the ACC after the next local election in May 1938, he was appointed the Deputy Mayor of Auckland. He died suddenly on 11 June 1938, and was buried at Waikumete Cemetery. He was survived by his wife and five children. Auckland City Council unveiled a memorial plaque for Richardson in the foyer of the Auckland Town Hall on 30 March 1939.

== Notes ==
Government offices
Preceded by Robert Ward Tate	Administrator of Western Samoa; 1923–1928	Succeeded by Stephen Allen
Political offices
Preceded by Bernard Martin	Deputy Mayor of Auckland; 1938	Succeeded by John Allum
