= Stephen Allen (colonial administrator) =

New Zealand lawyer, farmer and politician (1882-1964)

Sir Stephen Allen KBE CMG DSO* VD
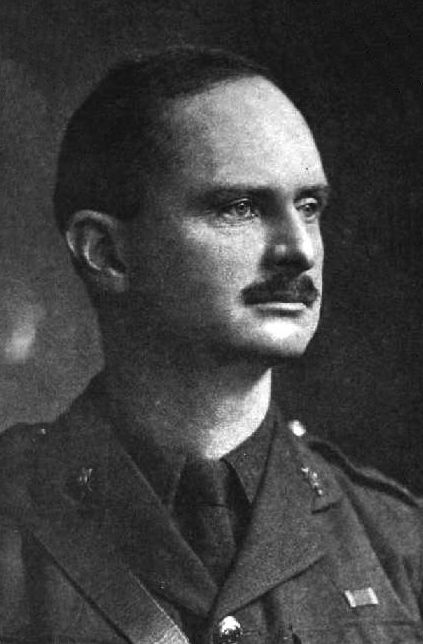

Administrator of Western Samoa
- In office 5 May 1928 – 3 April 1931
- Monarch: George V
- Preceded by: George Spafford Richardson
- Succeeded by: Herbert Ernest Hart

Personal details
- Born: Stephen Shepherd Allen; 2 August 1882
- Died: 4 November 1964 (aged 82) Near Maramarua, New Zealand
- Cause of death: Heart attack
- Relatives: William Shepherd Allen (father); John Candlish (grandfather); William Allen (brother); John Manchester Allen (nephew)

Sir Stephen Shepherd Allen KBE CMG DSO* VD (2 August 1882 – 4 November 1964) was a New Zealand lawyer, farmer, colonial administrator, local-body politician, and mayor of Morrinsville.

== Biography ==
Allen was the son of William Shepherd Allen, an MP in both the United Kingdom and New Zealand. His mother was Elizabeth Penelope Candlish, daughter of John Candlish.

He served in World War I, being appointed a Companion of the Order of St Michael and St George in the 1919 King's Birthday Honours, for his bravery during the battle of Passchendaele. Allen was a barrister and solicitor operating in the town of Morrinsville. He became mayor of the Borough of Morrinsville in 1927 but resigned one year later following an appointment as administrator of the colony of Western Samoa. His rule of Samoa was marked by the attempted suppression of the Mau movement, a nationalist movement.

Allen was appointed a Knight Commander of the Order of the British Empire (KBE) in the 1933 King's Birthday Honours. In 1935, he was awarded the King George V Silver Jubilee Medal.

Allen served in the Second World War as a staff captain of the British Army and as a military secretary to the New Zealand Expeditionary Force. The 2nd Battalion of the Auckland Regiment captured La Signy Farm (in Serre, France) under his command. Allen's property in Morrinsville was named La Signy Farm.

On 4 November 1964, Allen had a heart attack while driving near Maramarua, and both he and his housekeeper, Elma Jessie Brunton, died in the resulting crash.
