= Herbert Hart (general) =

Officer in the New Zealand Military Forces

Brigadier General Sir Herbert Hart KBE CB CMG DSO VD
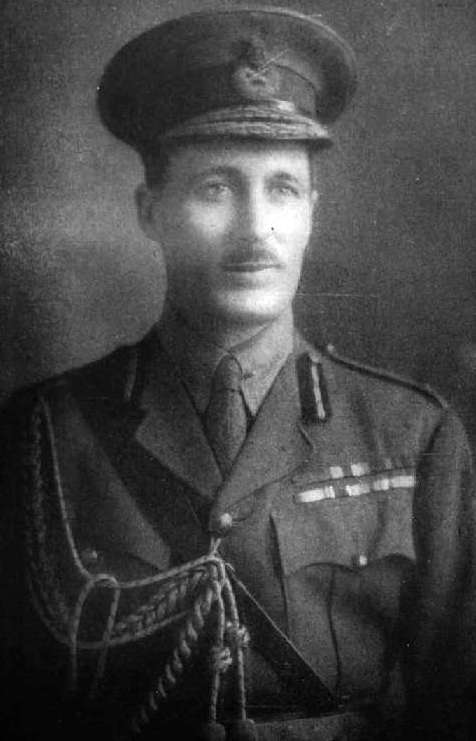
- Herbert Hart, in the uniform of a brigadier general

Administrator of Western Samoa
- In office 18 April 1931 – 25 July 1935
- Monarch: George V
- Preceded by: Stephen Allen
- Succeeded by: Alfred Turnbull

Personal details
- Born: Herbert Ernest Hart; 13 October 1882 Taratahi, New Zealand
- Died: 5 March 1968 (aged 85) Masterton, New Zealand
- Awards: Knight Commander of the Order of the British Empire; Companion of the Order of the Bath; Companion of the Order of St Michael and St George; Distinguished Service Order; Mentioned in Despatches (5); Colonial Auxiliary Forces Officers' Decoration; Croix de guerre (France)

Military service
- Allegiance: New Zealand
- Branch/service: New Zealand Military Forces
- Years of service: 1901–1930
- Rank: Brigadier General
- Commands: 3rd New Zealand (Rifle) Brigade (1918–19); Sling Camp (1918); 2nd Infantry Brigade (1918); 4th Infantry Brigade (1917–18); Wellington Infantry Battalion (1915–17)
- Battles/wars: Second Boer War; First World War; Gallipoli Campaign; Western Front

Brigadier General Sir Herbert Ernest Hart, KBE, CB, CMG, DSO, VD (13 October 1882 – 5 March 1968) was an officer in the New Zealand Military Forces who served during the Second Boer War and the First World War. He later served as the Administrator of Western Samoa and worked for the Imperial War Graves Commission.

Hart volunteered for the Ninth New Zealand South African Contingent, which was raised for service in South Africa during the Second Boer War. By the time the contingent arrived in South Africa, the war was largely over. He saw extensive action during the First World War as a volunteer with the New Zealand Expeditionary Force, first at Gallipoli and then on the Western Front. By the end of the war, he had advanced in rank to brigadier general, commanding a number of brigades in the New Zealand Division.

Trained as a lawyer before the war, Hart returned to New Zealand to resume his legal practice after his discharge from the New Zealand Expeditionary Force. He later served as Administrator of Western Samoa from 1931 to 1935 and was knighted for his services in this role. From 1936 to 1943, he worked in the Middle East for the Imperial War Graves Commission, a task made difficult by the outbreak of the Second World War and the subsequent fighting in the region. Following his retirement in late 1943, he became involved in Rotary International. He died at his home in Masterton on 5 March 1968.

== Early life ==
Hart was born at Taratahi, a small community near Carterton in the Wairarapa region. His father, William, was a farm labourer and the grandson of John Hart, a three-time Premier of South Australia. One of four children, he was educated firstly at Dalefield School, and then Carterton School. After finishing his formal education he worked for his uncle, an auctioneer and land broker, while also studying bookkeeping.

In 1900, Hart's brother Walter travelled to South Africa for service with the Fourth Contingent in the Second Boer War. This inspired Hart to volunteer for the Eighth New Zealand South African Contingent, but his application was declined. However, he, along with another brother, George, successfully enlisted for the Ninth Contingent. The minimum age for volunteers was 20 and he falsified his age to enlist. By the time he reached South Africa in April 1902, the war was effectively over. He was discharged in July 1902 with the rank of lance sergeant but travelled to England instead of returning to New Zealand with the rest of the contingent.

Hart eventually returned to New Zealand in early 1903. Shortly after his return he married Minnie Renall, the daughter of a farmer. The couple would have four children, one of whom died in infancy. He resumed working at his uncle's business and eventually became a director of the company. However, rather than pursue bookkeeping as a career, he commenced legal studies. He qualified as a solicitor in 1907, becoming a partner in a Carterton practice which he had joined the previous year.

Hart was also active in the Volunteer Force. It was common practice in the Volunteer Force for the men of a unit to elect their officers although they were sometimes directed by their superiors to vote for certain candidates. Hart was duly elected a lieutenant in the Carterton Rifle Volunteers. When the Volunteer Force was abolished in 1910 and replaced with the Territorial Force, which was organised more like a conventional military, he chose to continue his service. He was well regarded by his superiors and was promoted to captain in 1911. When he was promoted to major the following year, he was the youngest officer with that rank in his battalion. He was serving with the 1st Battalion of the 17th (Ruahine) Regiment when the First World War broke out.

== First World War ==
Following the outbreak of the First World War, Hart immediately volunteered for the New Zealand Expeditionary Force (NZEF), which was being raised for service in the war on Britain's behalf. He was appointed second in command of the Wellington Infantry Battalion, under Lieutenant Colonel William Malone. The battalion embarked from Wellington in October 1914 for Egypt, and upon arrival, was primarily engaged in training before it was deployed along the Suez Canal late in January 1915 to support Indian troops stationed to guard against a rumoured Turkish attack. Three weeks of sentry duty ensued for the battalion before returning to Cairo.

=== Gallipoli ===
At this stage of the war, the Allied forces were preparing for the Gallipoli Campaign, which was part of a plan conceived by the First Lord of the Admiralty, Winston Churchill, to seize control of the Dardanelles. This would leave the Turkish capital, Constantinople, vulnerable to attack. The New Zealand and Australian Division, under the command of Major General Alexander Godley (also commander of the NZEF), was being formed for the campaign, and Hart's battalion was attached to the New Zealand Infantry Brigade, one of the two infantry brigades (the other was the Australian 4th Brigade) that formed the bulk of the division. In April, the division embarked for Gallipoli and the Wellington Battalion was landed at Anzac Cove on the afternoon of 25 April, and made its way up to Plugge's Plateau.

The battalion was involved in defending against Turkish attacks on Walker's Ridge on 27 April. Hart was wounded in the thigh while supervising the establishment of defensive positions. His wounds necessitated his evacuation to Alexandria the following day. He was later awarded a Distinguished Service Order for his leadership of the battalion during this action.

Hart was promoted to lieutenant colonel while recovering from his wounds in England. He returned to the Dardanelles in September 1915 as commander of the Wellington Battalion, Malone having been killed in action in early August during the Battle of Chunuk Bair. The battalion had been decimated during the battle but remained in the line manning positions at 'The Apex', a knoll near Chunuk Bair. Along with the rest of the New Zealand Infantry Brigade, the battalion was transferred to the Greek island of Lemnos on 14 September for a period of rest and recuperation while it was also being built up with reinforcements from New Zealand. While on Lemnos, Hart commanded the brigade for a 12-day period when its nominal commander, Brigadier General Francis Earl Johnston, was hospitalised.

Hart led the battalion back to Gallipoli in early November, where it returned to its former positions at "The Apex". With no major offensive operations conducted since its return, he and his battalion eventually evacuated the peninsula in December, with Hart amongst the last of his unit to leave on 19 December.

=== Western Front ===
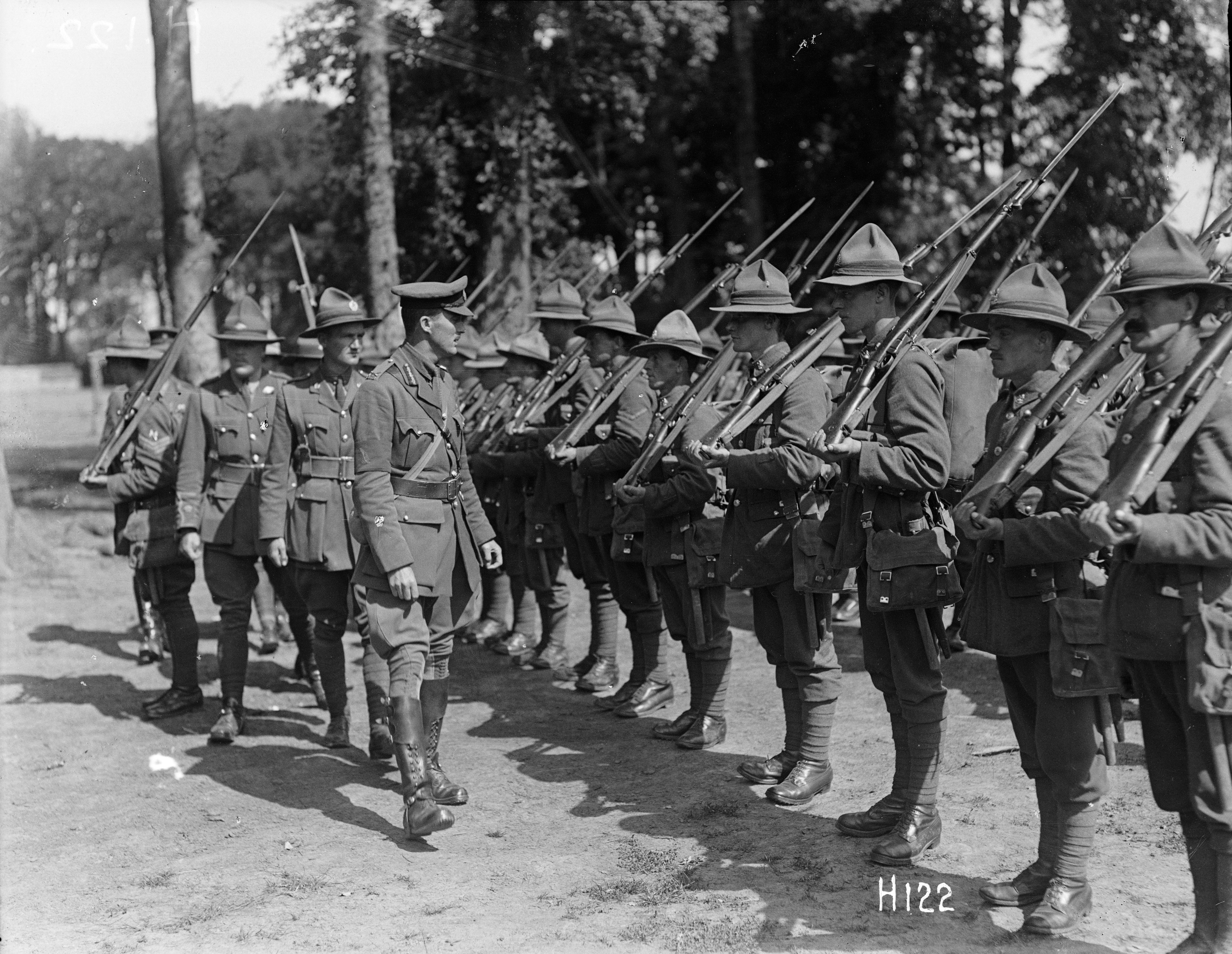
Brigadier General Hart inspecting men of the 4th Brigade, 6 July 1917

Returning to Egypt, Hart was heavily involved with the training of his command, which included a substantial number of replacements. He was also required to divest a number of his more experienced officers and non-commissioned officers to help with the formation of the 2nd Battalion of the Wellington Regiment. His battalion was subsequently re-designated as the 1st Battalion, Wellington Regiment, while the New Zealand Infantry Brigade was reformed as the 1st Infantry Brigade. The brigade was one of the three infantry brigades to make up the newly formed New Zealand Division, intended for service on the Western Front and it was duly shipped to France in April 1916.

The division was initially based near Armentières and Hart's battalion was among those manning the trenches in the sector. The battalion had to contend with artillery and repelling localised attacks and raids by the opposing Germans. Hart organised a counter-raid to be conducted by his battalion, and this was successfully executed on 1 July. The division would remain in the Armentières sector until August 1916, at which stage it was withdrawn for use in the forthcoming Somme Offensive in September. Hart led his battalion during the Battle of Flers-Courcelette and the subsequent period in the trenches, and was mentioned in despatches for his work during this time. He also had spells as temporary commander of the brigade while Johnston was on leave, and from December 1916 to January 1917 was in command of 3rd New Zealand (Rifle) Brigade.

In March 1917, Hart was promoted to brigadier general and appointed commander of the newly formed 4th Infantry Brigade. The new brigade was intended for service with the New Zealand Division. After a brief training period in England, the brigade was transferred to France for further training and a period in the front line. In October, it saw service during the successful attack on the Abraham Heights on the Gravenstafel Spur in what was known as the Battle of Broodseinde and was commended for its services by both Godley, still commanding the NZEF, and the commander of the New Zealand Division, Major General Andrew Russell. The brigade was in reserve for the subsequent First Battle of Passchendaele, and, apart from a brief period in training, would remain in the Ypres sector until January. He was mentioned in despatches for his work with the 4th Infantry Brigade while it was on the front line.

Hart was made commander of the 2nd Infantry Brigade when the 4th Brigade was disbanded in February 1918. He was mentioned in despatches for his work with the 4th Infantry Brigade while it was on the front line. His new brigade absorbed many of the soldiers of his previous command. However, on 18 February, just two weeks after taking command, he was badly gassed during an artillery barrage on his headquarters. The barrage, using a mixture of high explosive and mustard gas shells, also incapacitated most of his staff. Temporarily blinded, he was evacuated to a hospital in the rear and then to Étaples. After recovering his sight, which took about a week, he was dispatched to the south of France to convalesce.

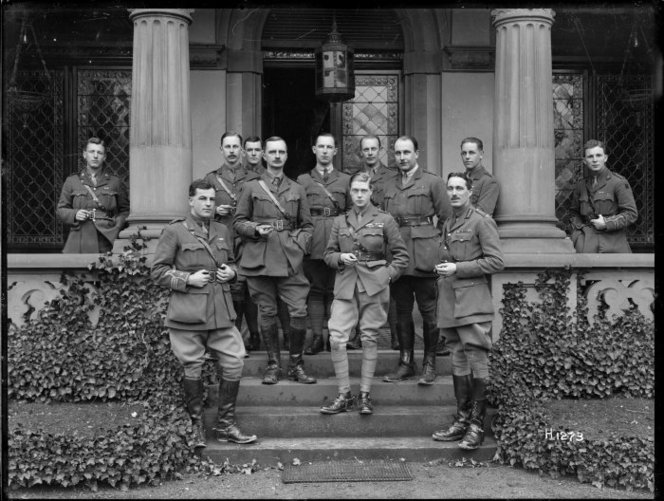
Hart (right front) with His Royal Highness Edward, Prince of Wales (centre front) and officers of the 3rd New Zealand (Rifle) Brigade, Cologne, January 1919

Upon recovery from the effects of his gassing, and aided by the temporary presence of his wife Minnie, Hart returned to England and was placed in command of the New Zealand reserves at Sling Camp in Bulford. Here he was responsible for the training of reinforcements and casualties who were regaining fitness. On 3 June, his leadership of the 4th Brigade was honoured with an appointment as a Companion of the Order of St Michael and St George, although he took little personal satisfaction in the recognition.

Brigadier General Herbert Hart outside his dugout near Bapaume, France, August 1918.

Hart's duties at Sling Camp ended in July, when he was recalled to France to take over command of the 3rd New Zealand (Rifle) Brigade. He led the brigade through the Hundred Days Offensive, which included an action during the Second Battle of Bapaume that impressed his commanding officer, Russell. During the battle, Hart's headquarters was again shelled with mustard gas. After his previous experience of being gassed, Hart found the shelling 'annoying'. The brigade also participated in the capture of Le Quesnoy in November 1918. This was a difficult assignment for the presence of civilians in the walled town meant that artillery could not support the attack. Instead a small party was able to scale the walls and put flight to the Germans defending that section. This allowed the remainder of the attacking force to enter the town, which quickly surrendered. A few days later, the mayor of Le Quesnoy presented Hart with the French flag that was raised over the town on the day it was captured from the Germans.

After the armistice that ended the war, Hart led the brigade into Germany for occupation duties with the remainder of the New Zealand Division. His headquarters was near Cologne and in January 1919, played host to the Prince of Wales. The division itself was in the process of demobilising, with around 1,000 men returning to New Zealand via England every week, and the Rifle Brigade was disbanded in early February. Hart was twice mentioned in despatches during his period in command of the Rifle Brigade. In mid-February he received his orders to return to New Zealand and he duly left England on 12 March 1919.

Hart arrived in his home town of Carterton to a hero's welcome on 25 April 1919, five years to the day after being landed at Gallipoli. The guest of honour at several receptions held around the Wairarapa over the next several days, he made a point of acknowledging the role played by the ordinary soldier in the eventual victory over the Germans while downplaying his own contributions. He was eventually discharged from the NZEF in late May 1919. His services in the war were subsequently recognised with his appointment as a Companion of the Order of the Bath in the 1919 King's Birthday Honours. The French government also awarded him with the Croix de guerre.

== Post-war career ==
Upon discharge from the NZEF, Hart resumed legal work in his Carterton practice. However, within a few months, he moved his family to Masterton and established a new law firm. He became involved with the charity organisation Rotary International and set up the Masterton chapter of Rotary in 1925. He maintained an association with the military; after an initial spell in the reserve of officers, he resumed his involvement with the Territorial Force and served as commander of the 2nd (Wellington) Infantry Brigade for several years. He was eventually returned to the reserve of officers in 1925. To acknowledge his long military career, he was awarded the Colonial Auxiliary Forces Officers' Decoration (VD) and appointed honorary colonel of his old Territorial Force unit, the Hawkes' Bay Regiment (formerly 17th (Ruahine) Regiment). He retired from the military in 1930.

Hart was a longtime advocate for the welfare of former soldiers and was active in the Returned Services Association (RSA). The organisation later awarded Hart the Gold Badge, its highest honour, for his advocacy on the behalf of former servicemen.

=== Western Samoa ===
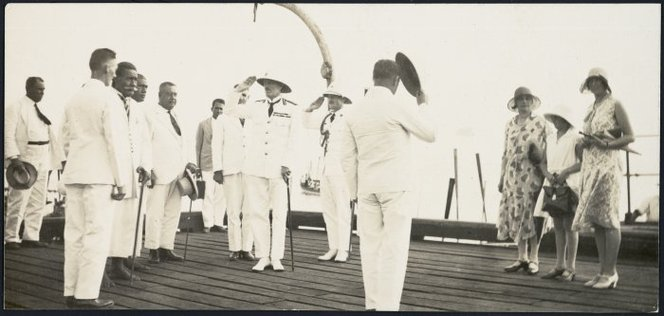
Hart (left centre, saluting) receiving the salute upon arrival in Apia, Western Samoa in April 1931

In 1930, Hart applied for and was appointed to the position of Administrator of Western Samoa, which was controlled by New Zealand under a mandate from the League of Nations. This was a difficult period for the colony as many of its citizens wanted independence. The Mau movement in particular was agitating for self-determination and employed tactics of civil disobedience as a means of opposing the New Zealand administration. After some heavy-handed management of protestors by his predecessor had resulted in several deaths amongst the movement, Hart made progress in improving relationships with the Mau when he took up his position in 1931. However he did demand that Olaf Frederick Nelson, a leader of the Mau who had returned from exile in New Zealand, be excluded from meetings he had with the leadership of the Mau. He also returned some financial stability to the colony which had struggled during the Great Depression. Hart was knighted as a Knight Commander of the Order of the British Empire in the 1935 King's Birthday Honours for his services in Samoa, shortly before completing his term as administrator and returning to New Zealand in July 1935.

=== Imperial War Graves Commission ===
In 1936, Hart accepted a position in the Middle East with the Imperial War Graves Commission (now the Commonwealth War Graves Commission). This position was usually the preserve of an Australian or New Zealander due to the number of dead from these two countries buried in the area. Although his new position of Deputy Controller of the Eastern District was nominally based in Jerusalem, he and his wife initially moved to Cairo because of the Arab revolt against the British Mandate in Palestine. It was not until March 1937, after the conditions in Palestine had sufficiently improved, that the couple moved to Jerusalem. They were later joined by their daughter, Bettina, who was married to a British Army officer also based in Jerusalem.

Hart's new role involved overseeing the upkeep of the cemeteries and memorials established by the Commission in the Middle East, Turkey and Greece. Ensuring the maintenance of these places required extensive travel, and his duties also became more difficult when Italy joined in the Second World War in June 1940 and conflict broke out in the Middle East. This required the creation of an organisation responsible for the graves of Allied personnel killed in the region. Consequently, Hart became Assistant Director, Graves Registration and Inquiry Section for the Middle East, in addition to his existing Commission duties. His new position entailed him becoming a serving officer in the British Army as a lieutenant, but with the acting rank of brigadier. He set up grave registration units, new cemeteries and organised the relocation of existing graves in remote areas to the new cemeteries. This work struck a personal note when his nephew was killed during the Second Battle of El Alamein in late 1942. Early the following year Hart visited the El Alamein battlefield and the nearby cemetery, the establishment of which was partly due to the infrastructure he helped put in place, to lay flowers at his nephew's grave.

Although he found the work satisfying, Hart retired from the Commission in September 1943. His wife, daughter, and Merrilyn, his granddaughter who had been born in Jerusalem, had left for New Zealand earlier that month. He followed a few weeks later once his successor at the Commission arrived. His work with the Graves Registration section had finished a year earlier.

== Later life ==
Settling back in the Wairarapa, Hart resumed his involvement with Rotary. He served a spell as president of the North Island district of Rotary, and attended overseas conventions. During the 1960s, there was a growing argument that the First World War was an unnecessary conflict. In speeches that he made during his community and RSA duties, he continued to advocate the importance of the war in countering Imperial German aggression. He attended reunions of his former units, including the Wellington Infantry Regiment and the Rifle Brigade. He had assisted the authors of the histories of both formations in the years after the First World War. In 1955, in honour of the 40th anniversary of the formation of the Rifle Brigade, Hart presented the flag which he had been given by the mayor of Le Quesnoy following its capture from the Germans in 1918 to Wellington Cathedral.

With age, Hart's involvement in community affairs decreased but he remained physically active, regularly playing golf and bowls. He died at his home in Masterton on 5 March 1968, his wife having predeceased him by nearly 18 months, and was buried with full military honours. The last surviving senior officer of the NZEF at the time of his death, he was well regarded by both the men he had commanded during the war and his superior officers.

== Notes ==
Government offices
Preceded by Stephen Allen	Administrator of Western Samoa; 1931–1935	Succeeded by Alfred Turnbull
