= Robert Ward Tate =

New Zealand governor (1864–1938)

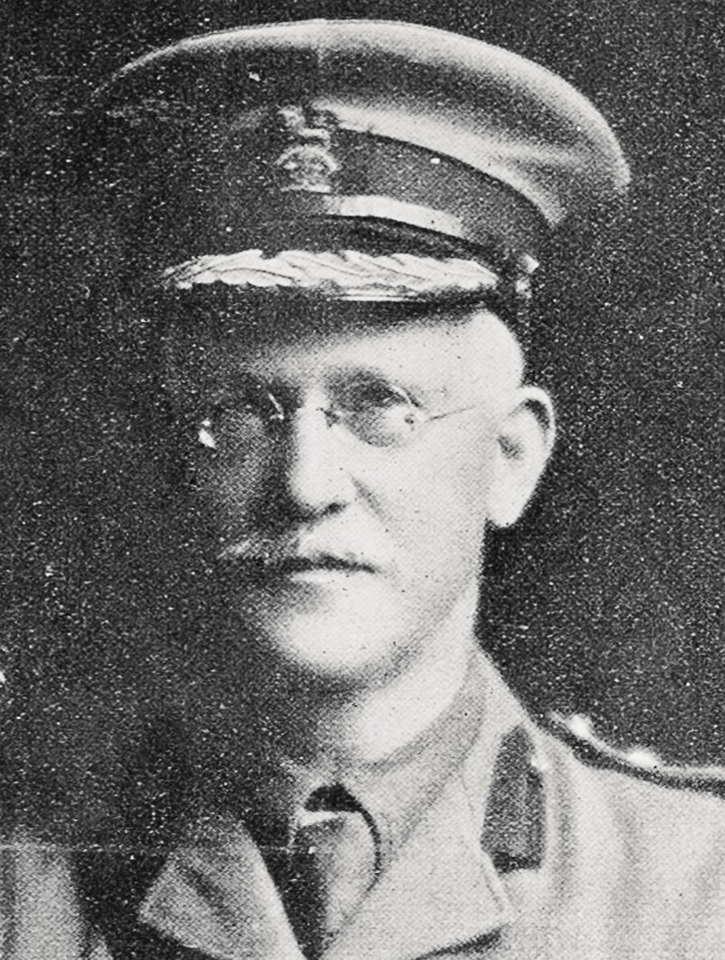
Robert Ward Tate

Colonel Robert Ward Tate CMG CBE VD (1864 – 28 December 1938) was a New Zealand lawyer and soldier who served as the first Civil Administrator of Samoa (then Western Samoa) from 28 January 1919 to 16 March 1923, succeeding Robert Logan.

Tate was born in Wellington and educated at Timaru Boys' High School before studying law. He was admitted to the bar of the then-Supreme Court of New Zealand in Christchurch in 1886, and moved to Greytown, New Zealand where he entered private practice. He was a prominent freemason.

He began his military career in the Timaru Battery. In 1911 he was appointed Colonel of the Wellington Infantry Brigade, and on the outbreak of the first world war was appointed officer commanding the Wellington District. In 1916 he was appointed Adjutant-General of the Dominion Defence Forces. In 1919 he was appointed acting Military Administrator of Samoa. In November 1919 he was appointed the first Civil Administrator. He arrived in Samoa in January 2020. as Administrator Tate exercised absolute authority in Samoa and excluded Samoans from their own government. His passage of the 1922 Samoan Offenders Ordinance, allowing the banishment of mata'i and the removal of titles, was a particular cause of resentment, and a driver of the Mau movement. He later blamed the unrest on ideas of racial equality.

On his return from Samoa he was appointed Stipendary Magistrate in Whangārei and New Plymouth. On his retirement in 1933 he returned to practicing law in Greytown.

He died aged 74 in Greytown Hospital. He was survived by his second wife, two sons and two daughters.

== Honours ==
He was appointed a Commander of the Order of the British Empire in the 1918 New Year Honours, and a Companion of the Order of St Michael and St George in the 1923 New Year Honours. In May 1935 he was awarded the King George V Silver Jubilee Medal.
