= Mau movement =

Samoan political movement

The Mau was a non-violent movement for Samoan independence from colonial rule during the first half of the 20th century. Mau means 'resolute' or 'resolved' in the sense of 'opinion', 'unwavering', 'to be decided', or 'testimony'; also denoting 'firm strength' in Samoan. The motto for the Mau were the words Samoa mo Samoa (Samoa for the Samoans). Similarly in Hawaiian Mau means to strive or persevere, and is often linked with Hawaiian poetry relating to independence and sovereignty struggles.

The movement had its beginnings on the island of Savai'i with the Mau a Pule resistance in the early 1900s with widespread support throughout the country by the late 1920s. As the movement grew, leadership came under the country's chiefly elite, the customary matai leaders entrenched in Samoan tradition and fa'a Samoa. The Mau included women who supported the national organisation through leadership and organisation as well as taking part in marches. Supporters wore a Mau uniform of a navy blue lavalava with a white stripe which was later banned by the colonial administration.

The Mau movement culminated on 28 December 1929 in the streets of the capital Apia, when the New Zealand military police fired on a procession who were attempting to prevent the arrest of one of their members. The day became known as Black Saturday. Up to 11 Samoans were killed, including Mau leader and one of the paramount chiefs of Samoa Tupua Tamasese Lealofi III with many others wounded. One New Zealand constable was clubbed to death by protesters following the outbreak of hostilities.

The Mau movement's efforts would ultimately result in the political independence of Samoa in 1962 but the height of the movement's activity in the Western Islands occurred in the late 1920s and early 1930s.

== History ==
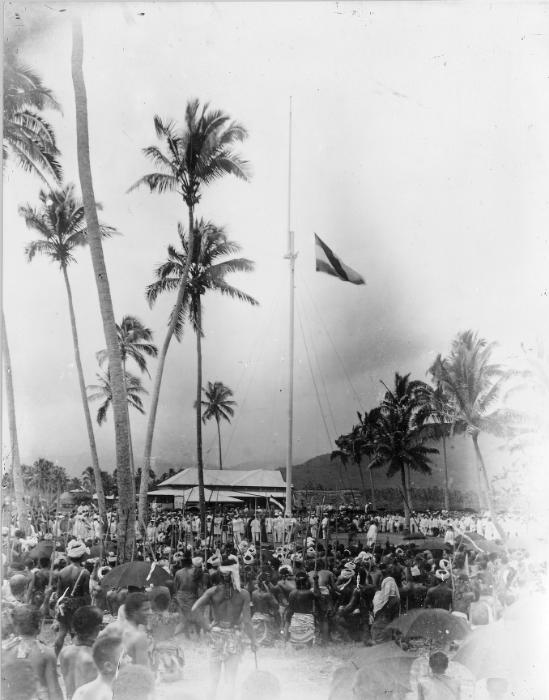
Raising the flag of German Samoa at Mulinuʻu, 1900. (photo by Alfred James Tattersall).

Broadly, the history of the Mau movement can be seen as beginning in the 19th century with European contact and the advent of Western powers, Britain, United States and Germany, vying for control of the Pacific nation. The country became German Samoa (1900–1914).

=== Formation of Mau a Pule ===
A key event occurred in 1908, in a dispute between the German colonial administration and the Malo o Samoa, or Samoan Council of Chiefs, over the establishment of a copra business owned and controlled by native Samoans.

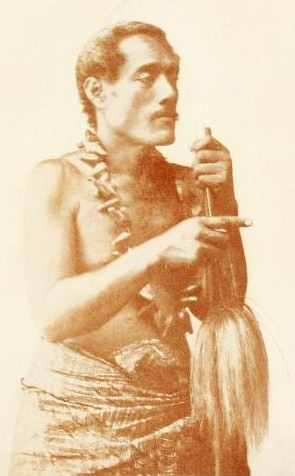
Exile Lauaki Namulau'ulu Mamoe (photo by Thomas Andrew).

The dispute led to the eventual formation of a resistance movement called Mau a Pule on Savai'i by Lauaki Namulau'ulu Mamoe, one of the Samoan leaders from Safotulafai who was deposed by the German Governor of Samoa, Wilhelm Solf. As well as deposing members of the Malo o Samoa, Solf called in two German warships as a show of strength. Lauaki returned with his warriors from Savai'i for battle. The German governor convinced Mata'afa to set up a "peace talk meeting" with Lauaki but that Lauaki had to disperse his army before the meeting. Unknown to Mata'afa was the intent of the German governor to rid of Lauaki. Lauaki, a man of honor, returned with his warriors to Savai'i as they were reluctant to leave Upolu without him. After ensuring his warriors' arrival to their villages, Lauaki returned to Upolu. As it took Lauaki several days to disperse his army, the German governor set up his trap.

Upon their return to Upolu, Lauaki and some of the Chiefs were betrayed at this "peace talk", held aboard the German ship. In 1909, Lauaki and the other senior leaders of the Mau a Pule were exiled to the German colonies in the Marianas (North West Pacific) where they were to stay until 1914, when New Zealand took over Samoa as part of its Empire duties at the outbreak of World War I. Many of those exiled died before returning to Samoa. Lauaki died en route back to Samoa in 1915.

In 1914, at the beginning of World War I, New Zealand forces, unopposed by the Germans, annexed Western Samoa.

=== Influenza epidemic ===
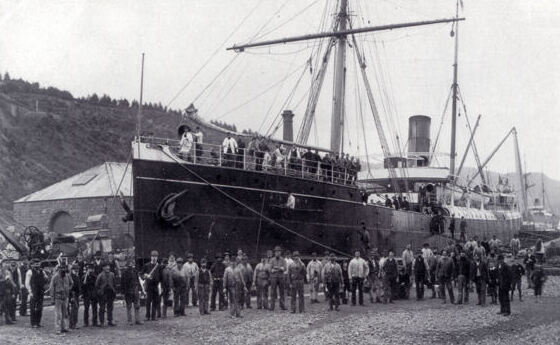
SS Talune in Port Chalmers graving dock in New Zealand c. 1890s

Military rule by New Zealand continued after the war ended, and in 1919, some 7,500 Samoans, around 22 per cent of the population, died during an influenza epidemic. It was already known that Samoans were most susceptible to minor European diseases, as they had never encountered them before. When the ship SS Talune arrived in Apia with its crew and passengers obviously sick with influenza, they were allowed to dock by the New Zealanders.

Two days later the first deaths were reported. No attempt was made by the New Zealand administrators to quell or contain the spread, and after one week it had spread through the whole of Samoa. Whole families were killed, with such alarming speed that corpses lay around for weeks without being buried. They were either thrown in mass graves or left in houses which were torched. However, in American Samoa, where quarantine precaution measures had been adequately taken, there were no deaths. Upon learning of the situation in Western Samoa, the American Governor offered help to Colonel Robert Logan who was in charge; Logan was a Scotsman who hated Americans. He destroyed the telegram and cut off any other contact to American Samoa. The Americans had a large medical team who could have saved many lives.

This catastrophic event was to lay a new foundation for discontent with an administration already perceived as incompetent and dishonest by many Samoans. The clumsy handling of Samoa's governance, the slow and deliberate erosion of traditional Samoan social structures by successive administrators, and a general failure to understand and respect Samoan culture also sowed the seeds for a revitalised resistance to colonial rule. Logan was replaced by Colonel Robert Ward Tate.

=== Mau leadership ===
The groundswell of support among Samoans for the Mau came from the leadership of Samoan matai, the heads of families in Samoa's traditional socio-political structure. Family and chiefly title connections, a central part of Samoan culture, were used to harness support. The success of the Mau in gathering national support showed that fa'a Samoa was still strong despite colonialism.

An example of this is found in the many stories of the Mau, in its early days as the fledgling movement began seeking support from matai. One of the urgent matters the early leadership faced was on the question of Savaii, as Pule (the senior orators and polity heads of Savaii) were yet to pledge their unanimous support. The position of its traditional rulers needed attention if the movement was to gain national appeal. The sensitive cultural maneuvering required for such an undertaking required more than the methods employed by those in Apia and so it was decided that Tumua (the senior orators and polity heads of Upolu) would travel to Savaii and ask for their support for the fledgling movement. The fleet of fautasi (canoes) embarked with Upolu's orators on board, led by the matua of Falefa, Luafalemana Moeono Taele, who after resigning his post in the administration's police force, joined the Mau. Choosing to arrive at Satupa'itea instead of the traditional Sale'aula, Moeono met with Asiata and in asking for his support, recalled Falefa's earlier support for the Mau a Pule (a precursor to the Mau Movement led Savaii's orators during the German administration). By recalling this, Asiata was compelled to assist and joined Tumua as they went on to Sale'aula. There, Moe'ono, Asiata and Tumua met with the assembled Pule and called on them to reciprocate their earlier solidarity by joining forces with Tumua in order to further strengthen the cause for independence.

Samoans of mixed parentage, facing discrimination from both cultures but with the advantage of cross-cultural knowledge, also played a key role in the new movement.

Olaf Frederick Nelson, one of the leaders of the new Mau movement, was a successful merchant of mixed Swedish and Samoan heritage. Nelson was the richest man in Samoa at the time and well-travelled. He was frustrated by the colonial administration's exclusion of native and part-Samoans from governance. Notably, he was one of many who had lost a child to the influenza epidemic of 1919 in addition to his mother, sister, only brother, and sister in-law. Although classified as a European, he considered himself Samoan "by birth, blood, and sentiment."

In 1926, Nelson visited Wellington to lobby the New Zealand government on the issue of increased self-rule. During his visit, the Minister for External Affairs, William Nosworthy, promised to visit Samoa to investigate. When Nosworthy postponed his trip, Nelson organised two public meetings in Apia, which were attended by hundreds, and The Samoan League, or O le Mau, was formed.

The Mau published the Samoa Guardian newspaper as a mouthpiece for the movement. To demonstrate the extent of popular support for the Mau, Nelson organised a sports meeting for movement members on the King's Birthday, in parallel with the official event, and held a well-attended ball at his home on the same night.

Movement members had begun to engage in acts of noncooperation: Neglecting the compulsory weekly search for the rhinoceros beetle, enemy of the coconut palm, thereby threatening the lucrative copra industry. When New Zealand administrators imposed a per-capita beetle quota, many Samoan villages resisted by breeding the insects in tightly woven baskets rather than comply with the orders to scour the forests and collect them.

In 1927, alarmed at the growing strength of the Mau, George Richardson, the administrator of Samoa, changed the law to allow the deportation of Europeans or part-Europeans charged with fomenting unrest. This action was presumably taken on the assumption that the growing movement was merely a product of self-interested Europeans agitating the native Samoans.

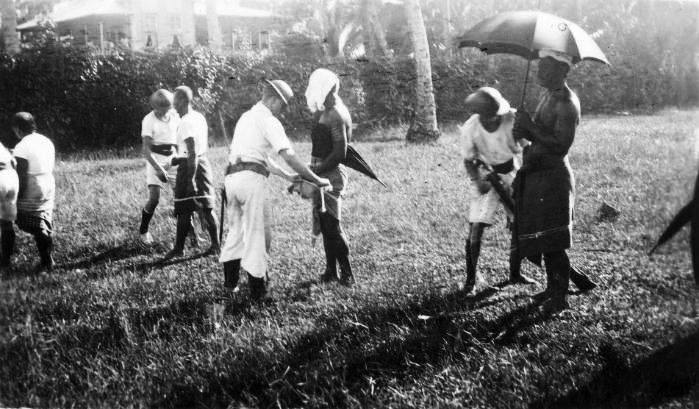
New Zealand sailors removing the white strip from lava-lava, the Mau uniform, circa 1930

In reality, however, the Mau was built upon the traditional forms of Samoan political organisation. In each village that joined the movement, a committee was formed, consisting of the chiefs and "talking men". These committees formed the basic element of an alternative system of governance, and the tendency of Samoans to unite under traditional leadership meant that by the mid- to late 1920s, around 85% of the Samoan population was involved in open resistance.

Following another visit to New Zealand to petition the Government, Nelson was exiled from Samoa along with two other part-European Mau leaders, Alfred Smyth and Edwin Gurr. The petition, which led to the formation of a joint select committee to investigate the situation in Samoa, quoted an ancient Samoan proverb: "We are moved by love, but never driven by intimidation."

=== Civil disobedience ===
The Mau remained true to this sentiment, and despite the exile of Nelson, continued to use civil disobedience to oppose the New Zealand administration. They boycotted imported products, refused to pay taxes and formed their own "police force", picketing stores in Apia to prevent the payment of customs to the authorities. Village committees established by the administration ceased to meet and government officials were ignored when they went on tour. Births and deaths went unregistered. Coconuts went unharvested, and the banana plantations were neglected.

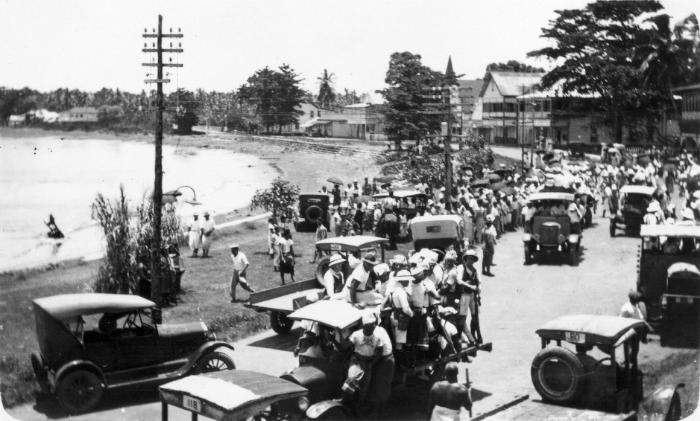
Mau prisoners being transported in the capital Apia

As the select committee was forced to admit, "a very substantial proportion of Samoans had joined the Mau, a number quite sufficient, if they determined to resist and thwart the activities of the Administration, to paralyse the functions of government."

Richardson sent a warship and a 70 strong force of marines to quell the largely non-violent resistance. 400 Mau members were arrested, but others responded by giving themselves up in such numbers that there were insufficient jail cells to detain them all, and the prisoners came and went as they pleased. One group of prisoners found themselves in a three-sided "cell" which faced the ocean, and were able to swim away to tend to their gardens and visit their families.

With his attempt at repression turning to ridicule, Richardson offered pardons to all those arrested; however, those arrested demanded to be dealt with by the court, and then refused to enter pleas to demonstrate their rejection of the court's jurisdiction.

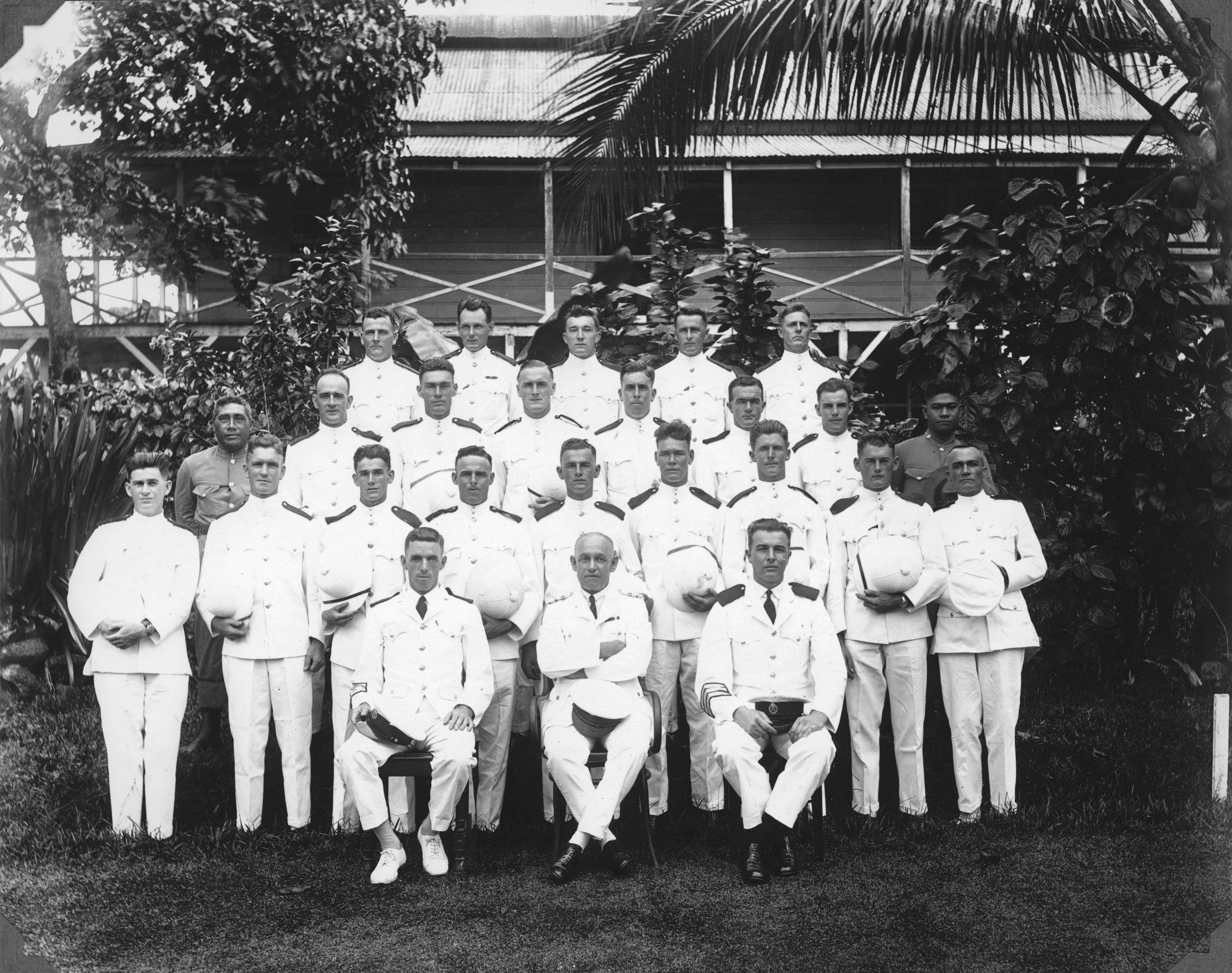
New Zealand police in Samoa during the Mau movement (photo by Alfred James Tattersall)

== Black Saturday, 29 December 1929 ==
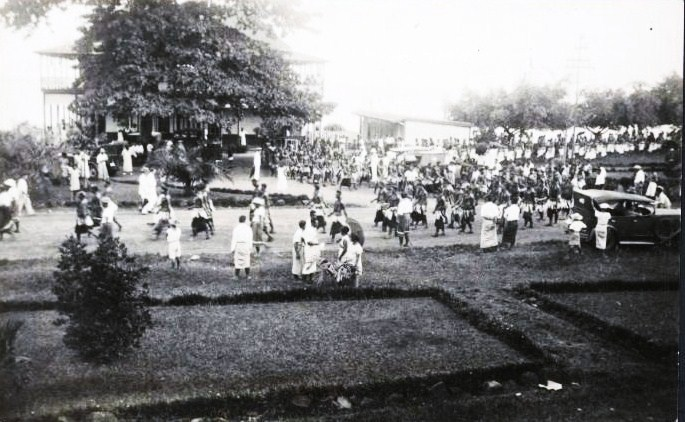
Mau demonstration in Apia, 1929

The new administrator, Stephen Allen, replaced the marines with a special force of New Zealand police, and began to target the leaders of the movement. Tupua Tamasese Lealofi III, who had led the movement following the exile of Nelson, was arrested for non-payment of taxes and imprisoned for six months.

On 29 December 1929 – which would be known thereafter as "Black Saturday" – New Zealand military police fired upon a peaceful demonstration which had assembled to welcome home Alfred Smyth, a European movement leader returning to Samoa after a two-year exile. Reports of the massacre are sketchy because the official cover-up for the incident was so effective. Tupua Tamasese Lealofi III had rushed to the front of the crowd and turned to face his people; he called for peace from them because some were throwing stones at the police. With his back to the police calling for peace he was shot in the back; another Samoan who rushed to help him was shot in both legs while cradling his head. Another who had attempted to shield his body from the bullets was shot. Two more rushing to help were killed before they could reach him.

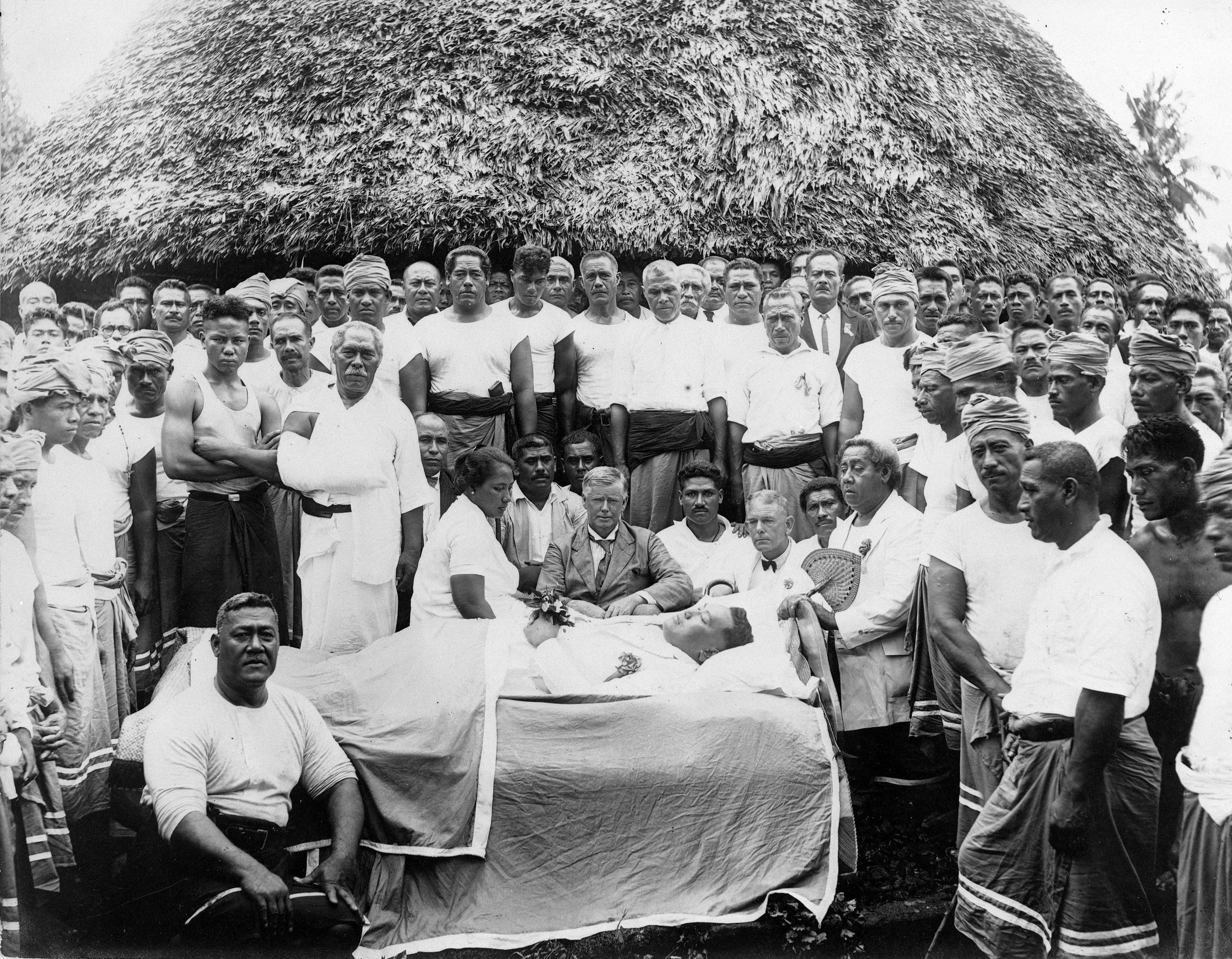
Mau leader Tupua Tamasese Lealofi III, assassinated by NZ Colonial Police.

Shooting stopped at around 6.30 p.m. Eight had died, three would later die, and about 50 were wounded. One policeman had also been clubbed to death.

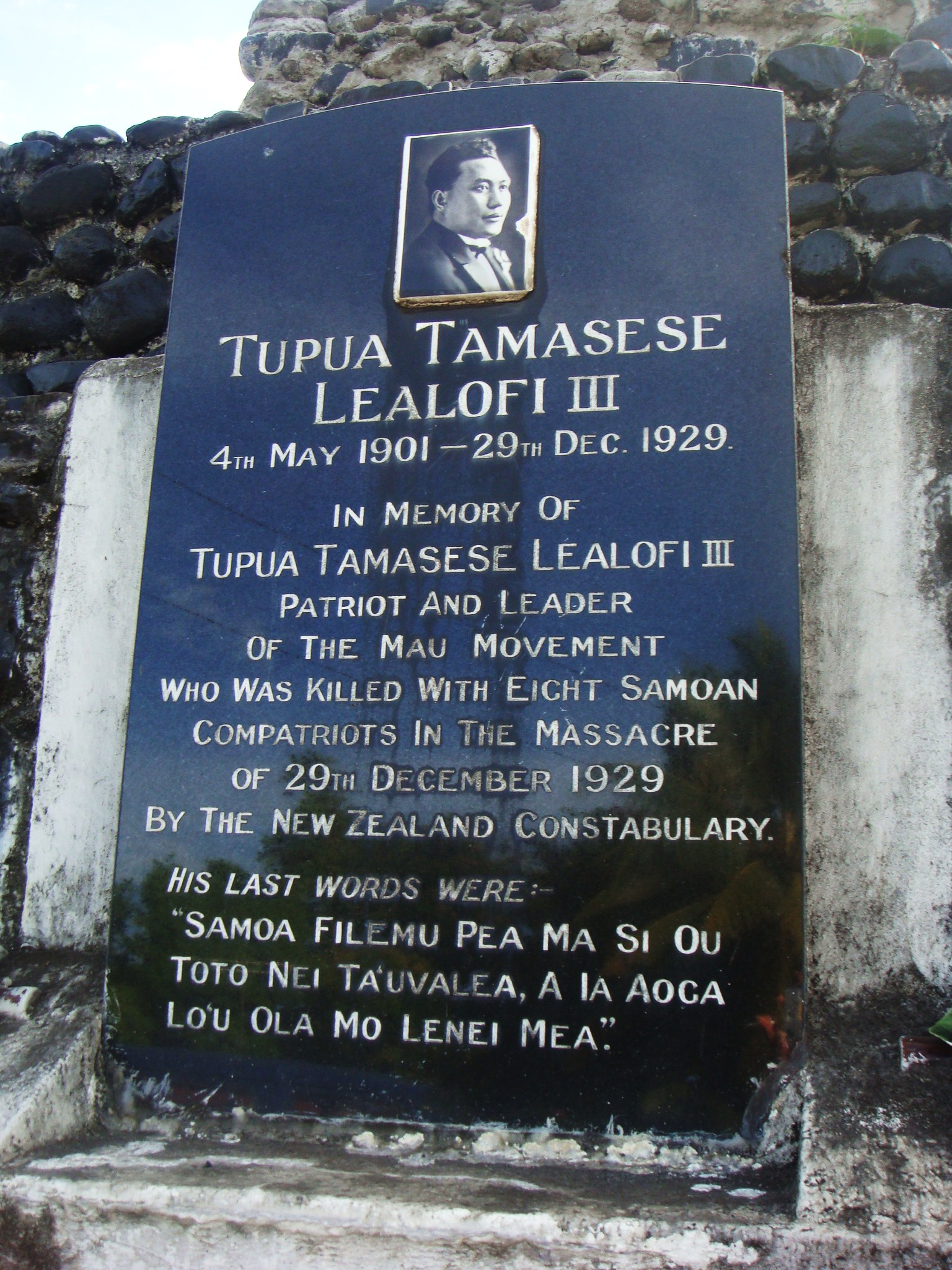
Grave of Tupua Tamasese Lealofi III in Lepea village with inscription of his last words in the Samoan language.

Among the wounded were terrified women and children who had fled to a market place for cover from New Zealand police firing from the verandah of the station, one of them wielding a Lewis machine-gun.

In the Mau's darkest period came its finest hour. As he lay dying, Tupua Tamasese Lealofi III knew that a bloody conflict would ensue between the Mau and New Zealand forces as a result of his death. Recognising the need for peaceful resistance if the Mau was to achieve its goal, Tamasese made this statement to his followers: "My blood has been spilt for Samoa, I am proud to give it. Do not dream of avenging it, as it was spilt in peace. If I die, peace must be maintained at any price".

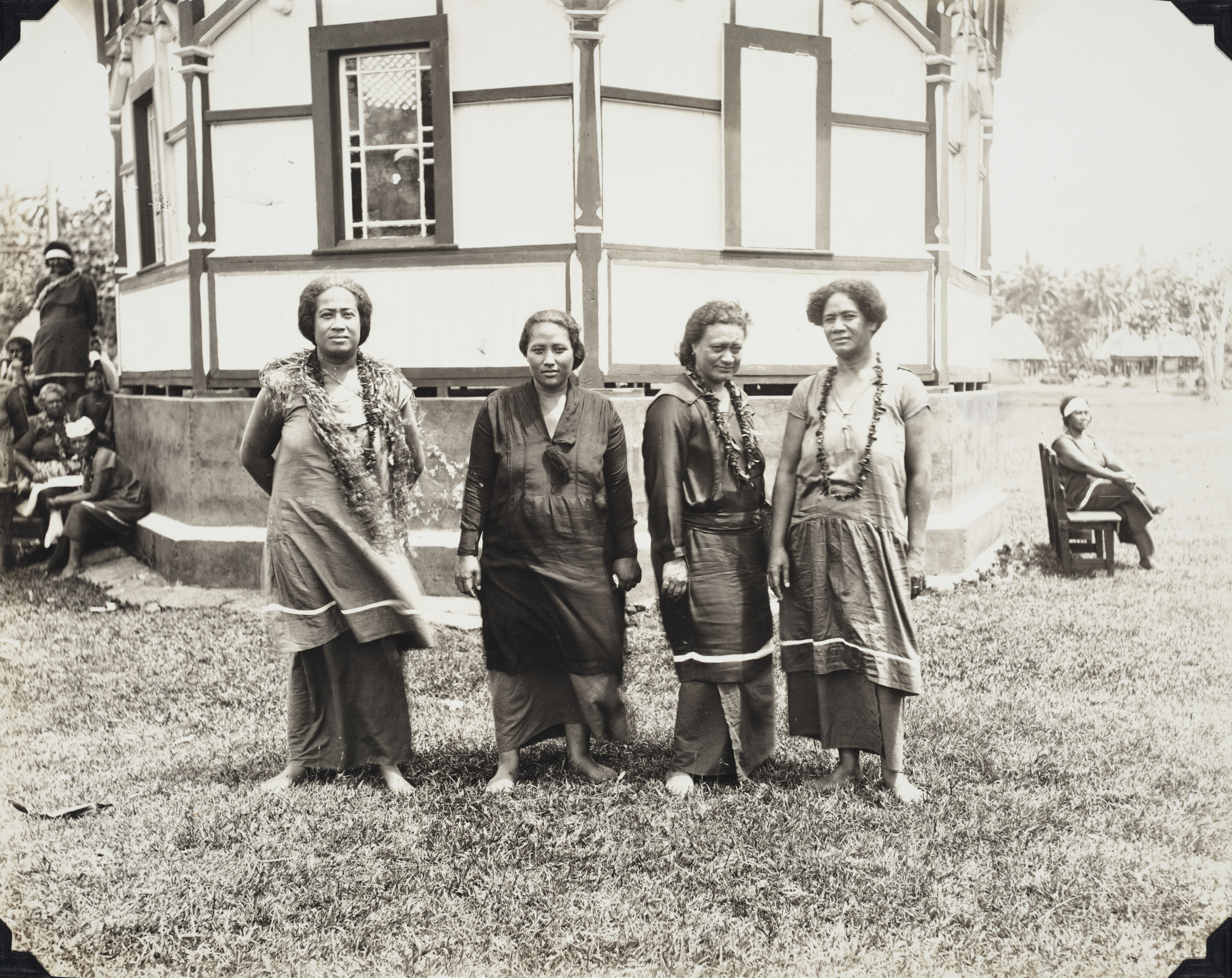
The leaders of the women's Mau; Mrs. Tuimaliifano, Mrs. Tamasese, Mrs. Nelson, Mrs. Faumuina, ca. 1930, (photo by Alfred James Tattersall).

After his burial, the Colonel Allen visited Vaimoso with a troop of special police in a show of force and chastised the Mau leadership. Assembled at Vaimoso were Mau members, senior matai and legions of followers, still mourning the slaying of their leader. One writer recalled how close the Governor was that night to "losing his head", had it not been for Lealofi III's parting words to his followers.

Following the massacre, arrests were made. The Mau feared arrest or exile. In order to continue the movement, the Women's Mau emerged days after the men had been forced to hide from the administration. The women's swift response to the tragic events of Black Saturday was made evident across the Pacific through Mau leader Taisi Olaf Nelson's telegram to New Zealand's Labor Party:

“...SAMOAN WOMEN ACTIVE ORGANIZING NEW MOVEMENT UNPARALLELED IN SAMOAN HISTORY..”

Many other women of the Mau, had taken charge, not only of hiding and protecting the Samoan men, but also of continuing the movement's political affairs such as writing letters of complaint, organizing protests, etc. It has been called a successful movement by scholars.

The day after his funeral, his village was raided by New Zealand military police; they ransacked houses, including those of the Tamasese's mourning widow and children. Colonel Allen requested reinforcements from New Zealand after he claimed 2,000 Mau had caused a riot.

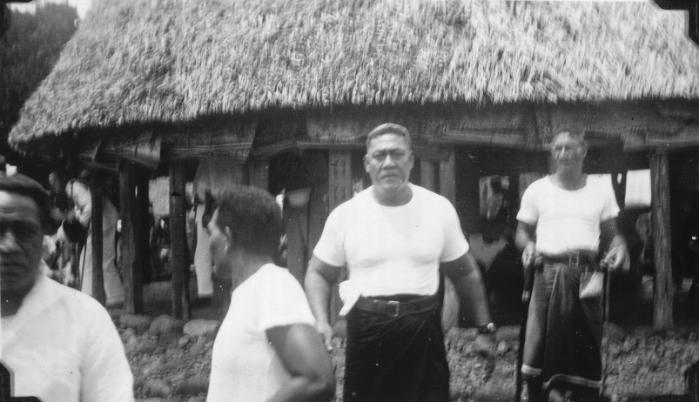
High chief Mataʻafa Faumuina Fiame Mulinuʻu I, a leader of the Mau who became President of the Mau following Tamasese's death, circa 1930. He was succeeded by Tamasese's younger brother, Tupua Tamasese Meaole who would go on to serve as first co-head of state of the newly independent State of Samoa.

On 12 January 1930 the Royal New Zealand Navy flagship Dunedin brought marines to hunt down members of the Mau. The Mau, who were fully committed to passive resistance, easily slipped through the bush; the marines were slow because they were carrying too much weaponry and didn't know the bush like the Mau. The Mau no longer trusted New Zealand police, and this fear only got worse after a 16-year-old unarmed Samoan was shot and killed while running away from a marine, whose excuse he thought the boy was going to throw a stone was accepted as an adequate defence and no charges were laid.

A truce was declared on 12 March 1930, after another child was killed by New Zealand marines who were now suffering heat exhaustion and tropical infections. The male Mau members returned to their homes, on the condition that they retain their right to engage in non-cooperation. Meanwhile, Nelson and other exiled leaders continued to lobby the New Zealand Government and communicate their progress to the Mau. In 1931, news of the growing Indian independence movement reached Samoa, partially inspiring the Mau movement.

== Moving towards independence ==
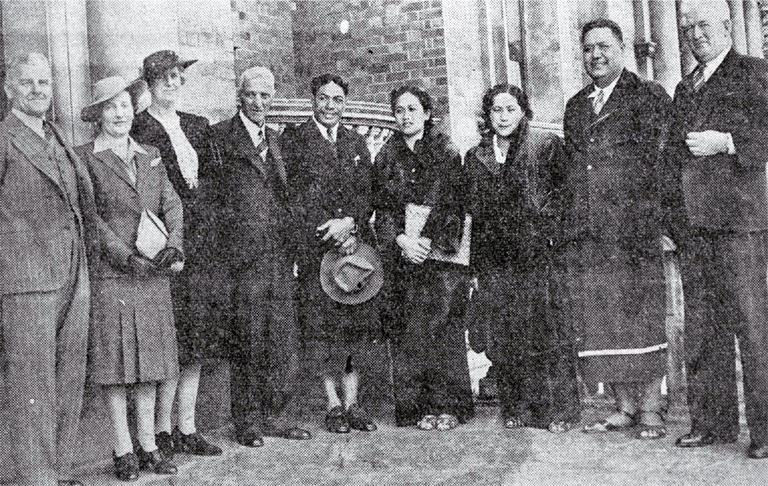
Tupua Tamasese Meaole and Malietoa Tanumafili II and their wives shown being entertained by the mayor, Ernest Herbert Andrews (1873–1961). In the group from left to right are: the Town Clerk (H.S. Feast), Mrs Feast, Mrs Melville Edwin Lyons, the Mayor, the Hon. Tamasese, Mrs Tamasese, Mrs Malietoa, the Hon. Malietoa, and the Deputy-Mayor (Melville Edwin Lyons).

After five years in exile in New Zealand, Nelson returned to Samoa in May 1933, and continued his advocacy. General Hart, the New Zealand administrator, demanded that Nelson be excluded from any meeting (fono) with the leadership of the Mau. The Mau insistence that Nelson should be one of its delegates. General Hart ordered police raids on the Mau's headquarters at Vaimoso and Nelson's residence at Tuaefu, which occurred on 15 November 1933. Eight Samoan chiefs, leaders of the Mau, who were members of a conference of 100 assembled at Tuatuanu’u were arrested on charges of collecting monies for unlawful purposes and engaging in Mau activities. A week later a further seven chiefs were arrested at Savaii.

Six months after his return to Samoa, Nelson was convicted of three charges of being connected to the Mau for which he was sentenced to ten additional years in exile as well as eight months imprisonment in New Zealand. The Mau movement had not gone unnoticed by the population of New Zealand, and the treatment of Samoans at the hands of the administration had become a contentious issue in some New Zealand electorates during the New Zealand general election in 1935, which was won by Labour. Nelson's exile was cut short in 1936. He returned to Samoa, and helped in the signing of the co-operation agreement between Samoan leaders and the New Zealand administration. He was subsequently elected to the Legislative Council in 1938 and re-elected in 1941.

1936 marked a turning point for Samoa, with the election of a Labour Government in New Zealand and the subsequent relaxation of repression by the New Zealand administration in Samoa. In the following years, there was slow movement towards greater involvement of Samoans in the administration of their own country, with a Samoan Parliament (Fono) being opened on 30 September 1936 at Mulinuʻu with elected representatives, to supersede the parliament composed of Samoans appointed by the New Zealand Administration. There were further acts of civil disobedience, including a sit-in protest in parliament over the payment of the representatives. In 1946, after the end of the Pacific War, a Fono of representative of the districts of Samoa voted to reject a Trusteeship Agreement put forward by New Zealand, with the Fono stating a desire for self-government.

== 1962 independence ==
When Western Samoa gained its independence in 1962, Tupua Tamasese Meaole, younger brother of the Mau leader Tupua Tamasese Lealofi III and his successor, became its first co-head of state with Malietoa Tanumafili II.

Fiamē Mataʻafa Faumuina Mulinuʻu II (1921–1975), the son of another high chief and Mau leader Mataʻafa Faumuina Fiame Mulinuʻu I, became the first Prime Minister of Samoa.

In July 1997, the Samoa Constitution was amended to change the country's name to Samoa, and officially the Independent State of Samoa.

== New Zealand apology to Samoa ==
In 2002, Helen Clark, Prime Minister of New Zealand made an unprecedented move and apologised to Samoa for New Zealand's treatment of Samoans during the colonial era. Clark made the apology in the capital Apia during the 40th anniversary of Samoa's independence. The apology covered the influenza epidemic of 1918, the shooting of unarmed Mau protesters by New Zealand police in 1929 and the banishing of matai (chiefs) from their homes.

== An American Samoa Mau ==
The Mau movement was an indigenous opposition to the U.S. annexation of the eastern Samoan islands in 1899, and had manifestations in both the Western and Eastern Samoan island groups. It featured the signing of petitions in efforts to enact political transformation vis-a-vis American colonial government, and included effort to resist taxation of copra.

There was an American Samoa Mau that took place in Tutuila in American Samoa in the 1920s. It emerged as a result of fluctuating prices of copra and represented an open affront to the American Navy and its patterns of treatment of the indigenous Samoan people and failure to respect Samoan customs, conceptions of self-government and the Samoan way of life. This movement received a lot of press in the United States, both favourable and unfavourable.

The Mau movement, called O le Mau in Samoan, has also been known in American Samoa by several other names, including The Committee of Samoan Chiefs, The Samoan Movement, The Samoan Cause, The Samoan League, and The Committee of the Samoan League.

The leader of the movement, Samuel Sailele Ripley of Leone, Tutuila, was in effect exiled from American Samoa, when he was barred by the US Navy authorities from disembarking from a ship returning to American Samoa from California, and he was never allowed to return to his homeland. He eventually became the mayor of Richmond, California.

The United States sent a committee to American Samoa in 1930, including US citizens from Hawaii who had a prominent role in the overthrow of the Kingdom of Hawaii and Queen Lili'uokalani. Their report, favourable to the US position, had a considerable influence on US policy, and the American Samoa Mau was totally suppressed by the US. Its influence however continued to be felt.

== Contemporary influences ==
A Samoan hip hop group that was founded in 1990 by Kosmo, M.C. Kha Tha Feelstyle Orator and D.J. Rockit V. The Mau was named for the Mau movement. The motto of the group became the same as the motto of the Mau movement: Samoa Mo Samoa ("Samoa for Samoans"). The Mau has now reformed as the group Rough Opinion. The group still carries the message of the Mau movement as their theme.

== See also ==
- History of Samoa
- Colonialism
- German Samoa
