= Samoa Expeditionary Force =

New Zealand Army and naval expeditionary force during World War I

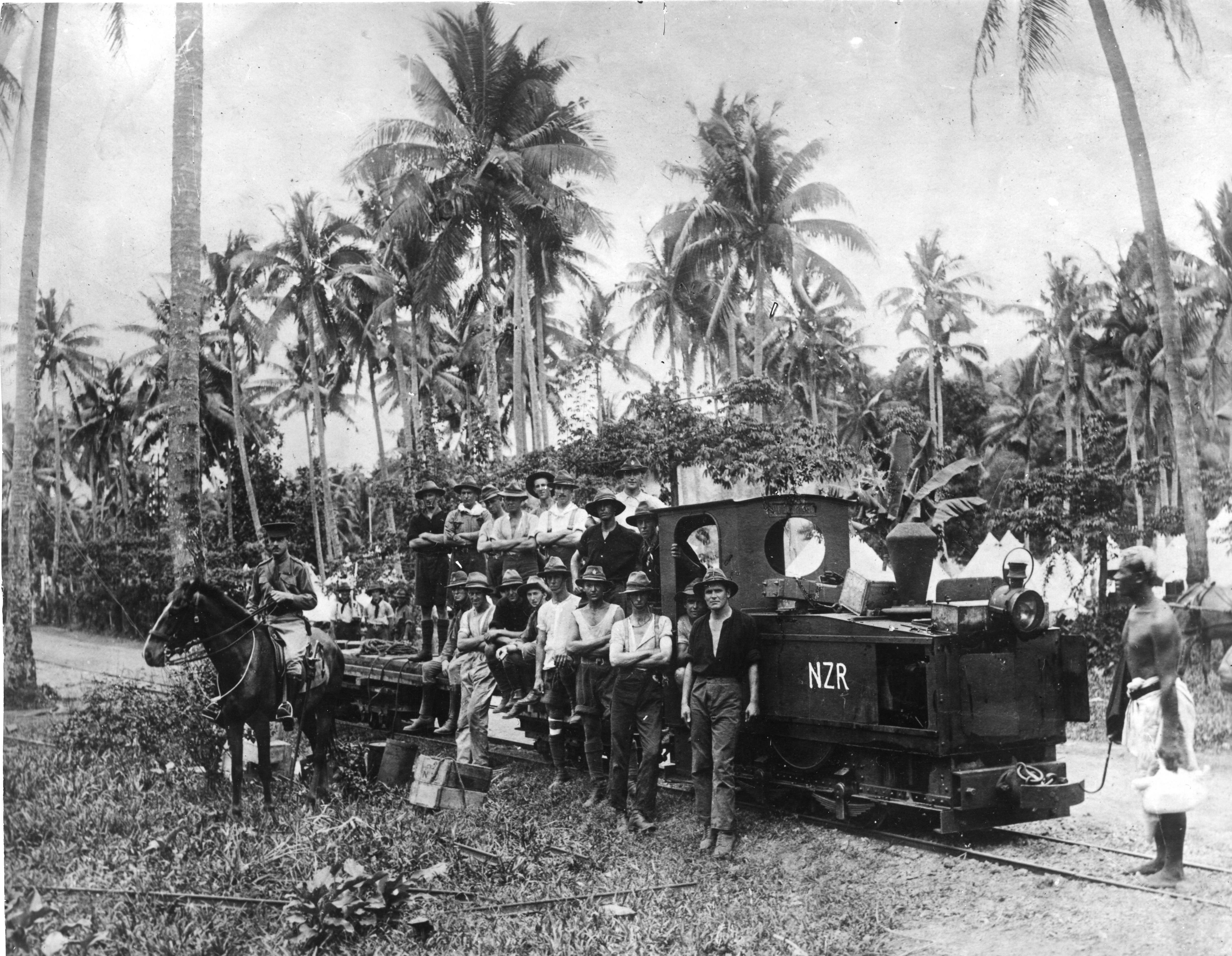
- New Zealand troops in Samoa, c. 1914–15.
- Active: 1914–1915
- Country: New Zealand
- Allegiance: Britain
- Branch: New Zealand Military Forces
- Size: 1,400 men
- Engagements: World War I

Commanders
- Commander: Colonel Robert Logan

The Samoa Expeditionary Force (SEF) was a small volunteer force of approximately 1,400 men raised in New Zealand shortly after the outbreak of World War I to seize and destroy the German wireless station in German Samoa in the south-west Pacific. Britain wanted the German wireless installations to be destroyed because they were used by Vizeadmiral (Vice Admiral) Maximilian von Spee's East Asia Squadron of the Imperial German Navy, which threatened British merchant shipping. Following the capture of German possessions in the region, the SEF provided occupation forces for the duration of the war. Australia provided a similar force for the Allied occupation of German New Guinea.

== History ==
=== Purpose ===
Upon the outbreak of World War I on 5 August 1914, the New Zealand Government authorised the raising of the New Zealand Expeditionary Force (NZEF) for service in the war. Mobilisation for the war had already begun, with preparations discreetly beginning a few days prior. The day after the declaration of war, the British Government requested New Zealand seize the wireless station at German Samoa, a protectorate of the German Empire, deeming it "a great and urgent Imperial service." The occupation of German Samoa was actually in accordance with plans laid down prior to the war by the Commander of the New Zealand Military Forces, Major General Alexander Godley.

=== Formation and deployment ===
The Samoa Expeditionary Force began forming following the British request. Colonel Robert Logan, a member of the New Zealand Staff Corps and commander of the Auckland Military District, was appointed to command of the SEF. By 11 August 1914, the SEF consisted of over 1,400 personnel, including three companies of infantry and a company of field engineers. It departed New Zealand on 15 August in a convoy of troopships escorted by the cruisers Philomel, Pyramus and Psyche. After stopping at Nouméa in New Caledonia, where the convoy was joined by the battlecruiser HMAS Australia, the cruiser HMAS Melbourne and the French cruiser Montcalm, the entire expedition, now under the command of Rear Admiral George Edwin Patey, went on to Fiji. Here several Legion-of-Frontiersmen and Samoan chiefs joined the SEF and it then sailed for Samoa on 27 August.

Despite concerns that Spee's East Asia Squadron of two armored cruisers (Scharnhorst and Gneisenau) and four light cruisers (Nürnberg, Leipzig, Dresden and Emden) would interfere with proceedings, the SEF arrived at Apia, the capital of Samoa, on 29 August. It made an unopposed landing, covered by the guns of the accompanying escorts, and secured the Government offices in the town as well as the wireless station several miles away. Logan, now the Military Administrator of Samoa and with the German governor Erich Schultz-Ewerth as prisoner of war, oversaw the official raising of the Union Jack the following day, formally declaring the occupation of German Samoa.

The SEF remained in Samoa until March 1915, when it began returning to New Zealand. A small relief force arrived in Apia on 3 April 1915 and the troopship that brought them to Samoa transported the last of the SEF back to New Zealand. Logan remained and would continue to administer the country on behalf of the New Zealand Government until 1919. His term was controversial for he significantly mishandled the arrival of the Spanish flu influenza pandemic in November 1918, resulting in over 7,500 deaths.

== Order of Battle ==
Samoa Expeditionary Force (August 1914)

- 3rd (Auckland) Regiment (one company, 253 personnel)
- 5th (Wellington) Regiment (two companies, 559 personnel)
- D Battery, New Zealand Artillery (two BL 15-pounder Mk IV guns and two QF 6-pounder Nordenfelt guns, 100 personnel)
- No.4 Company, New Zealand Engineers (two sections, 60 personnel)
- New Zealand Railway Engineers (one company, 258 personnel)
- New Zealand Medical Corps (78 personnel, including 6 nursing sisters)
- Divisional Signal Corps (26 personnel)
- 5th (Wellington) Regimental Band (26 personnel)

== Gallery ==
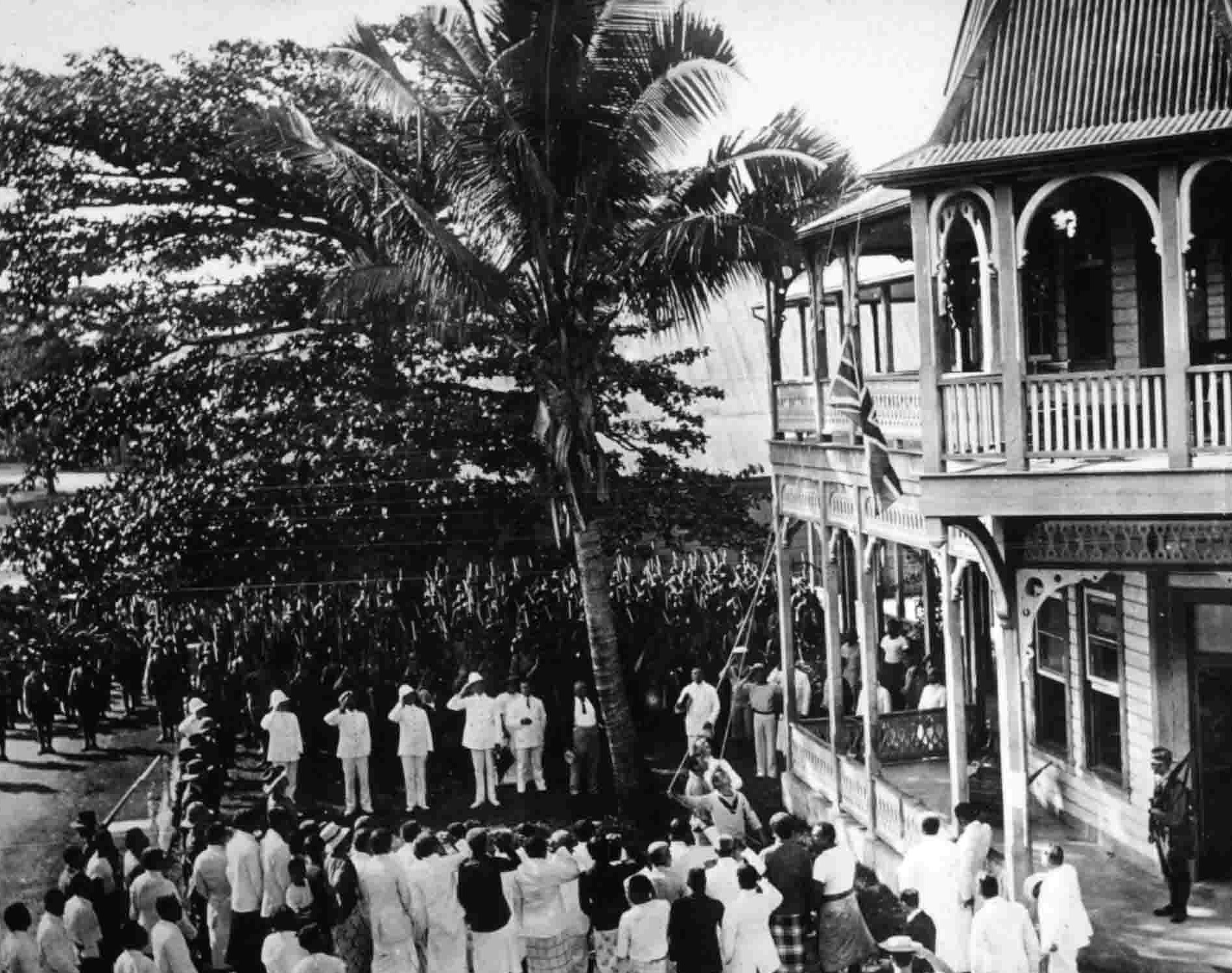
The raising of the Union Jack on 30 August 1914 in Apia, Samoa.

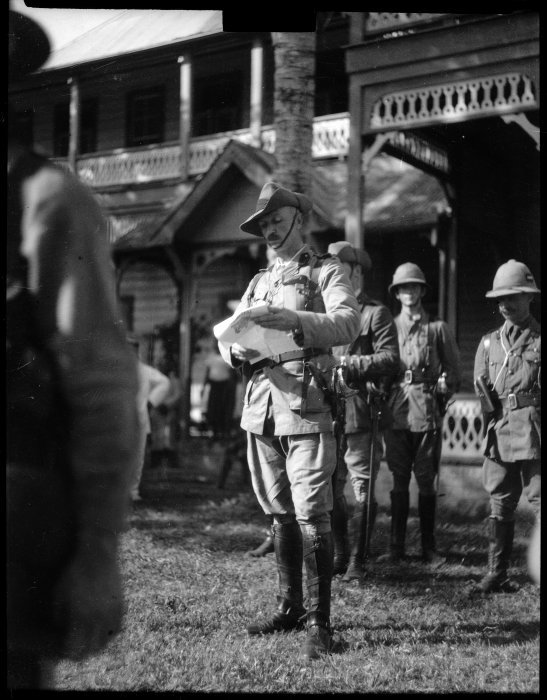
Colonel Robert Logan reading a proclamation in Apia, Samoa, on 29 August 1914, the day he assumed responsibility as military administrator.

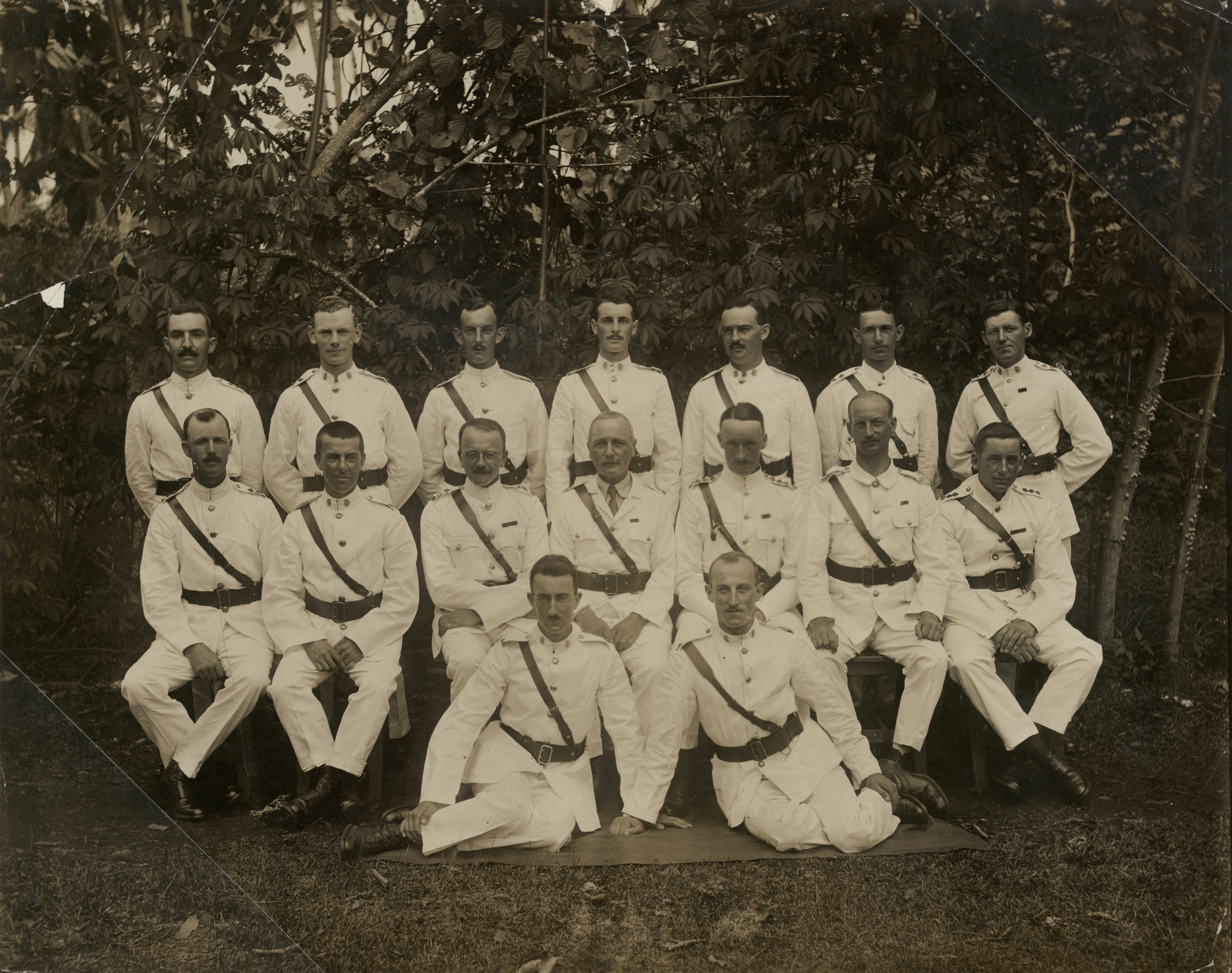
Officers of the 5th (Wellington) Regiment in Apia, c. 1914-1915

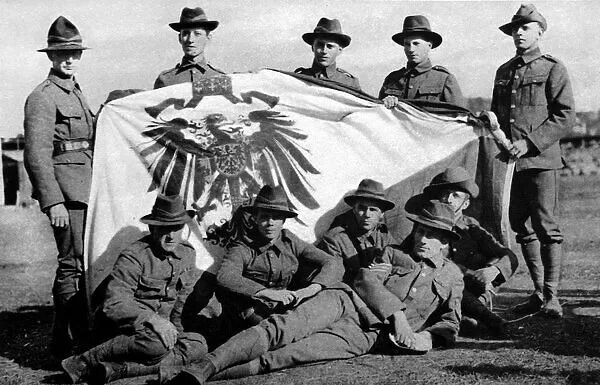
New Zealand troops displaying a captured German flag in Apia

== Notes ==
Citations
