= Robert Logan (politician) =

New Zealand military leader, administrator

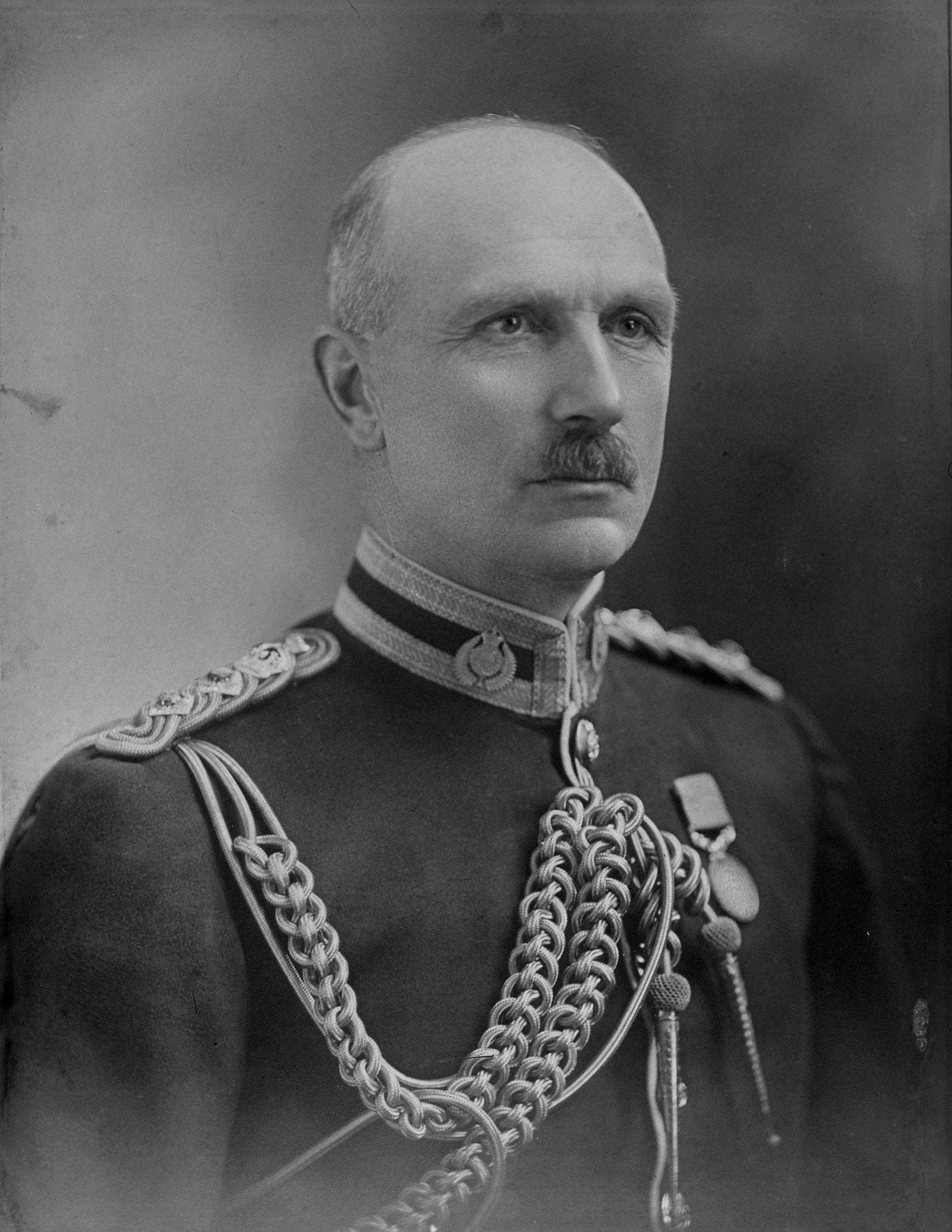
- Born: 2 April 1863; Langton, Berwickshire, Scotland
- Died: 4 February 1935 (aged 71); Seaton, Devon, England
- Military career
- Allegiance: New Zealand, British Empire
- Branch: New Zealand Military Forces
- Rank: Colonel
- Conflicts: First World War; Occupation of German Samoa
- Awards: Companion of the Order of the Bath; Chavalier of the Legion of Honour (France)

Robert Logan CB (2 April 1863 – 4 February 1935) was an officer in the New Zealand Military Forces who served in the First World War as the Military Administrator of Samoa.

Born in 1863 in Scotland, Logan migrated to New Zealand in 1881 and took up farming. Also involved in the militia, he became a professional soldier in 1912 when he joined the New Zealand Military Forces. He was commanding the Auckland Military District at the time of the outbreak of the First World War and was appointed the commander of the Samoa Expeditionary Force, dispatched from New Zealand to occupy the island of Samoa, a territory of the German Empire at the time. Samoa was easily occupied on 29 August 1914 and Logan became its Military Administrator; he remained in this capacity for the duration of the war. Although he was decorated for his services, his administration of Samoa was later criticised, particularly in relation to the handling of the influenza outbreak of November 1918, which led to 7,500 deaths. Logan retired from military service in 1919 and settled in Devon, England, where he died in 1935.

== Early life ==
Robert Logan was born in Langton, Berwickshire, Scotland, on 2 April 1863 to Thomas Logan, a tenant farmer, and his wife, Euphemia Helen Logan. He was educated at Edinburgh Academy. In 1881, when he was 19, Logan migrated to New Zealand.

== Life in New Zealand ==
Logan settled in Southland and found work as a farmhand. After a couple of years, he became a runholder, buying a sheep farm at Maniototo, in the Otago district, which he ran for several years. He married Elizabeth Catherine Preston at Fortrose, Southland, on 16 April 1890. The couple would go on to have four sons, although one died in infancy. He became involved in local politics, joining the Maniototo County Council in 1888 and from 1901 to 1902, was its chairman. Logan's wife Elizabeth died in 1910, leaving him to raise his three surviving sons on his own, until he remarried in 1914. Logan and his second wife, Eleanor Mary Preston, had two daughters.

== Military career ==
In 1912, Logan joined the New Zealand Military Forces and was posted to the New Zealand Staff Corps as a temporary colonel. He was already an experienced soldier of the New Zealand militia, known as the Volunteer Force, having raised the Maniototo Mounted Rifle Volunteers in 1900. He had then served with the 1st Otago Mounted Rifle Volunteers four years later with the rank of major, and was then promoted to lieutenant colonel in 1908. Now, as a professional soldier with the New Zealand Staff Corps, he was appointed commander of the Auckland Military District. Consequently, he sold the sheep farm at Maniototo and moved his family north to Auckland.

=== First World War ===
Upon the outbreak of the First World War on 5 August 1914, the New Zealand Government authorised the raising of the New Zealand Expeditionary Force (NZEF) for service in the war. Mobilisation had already begun, preparations discreetly beginning a few days prior. The day after the declaration of war, the British Government requested New Zealand seize the wireless station on the island of Samoa, a territory of Imperial Germany. The occupation of Samoa was actually in accordance with plans laid down prior to the war by the commander of the New Zealand Military Forces, Major General Alexander Godley.

==== Samoa ====
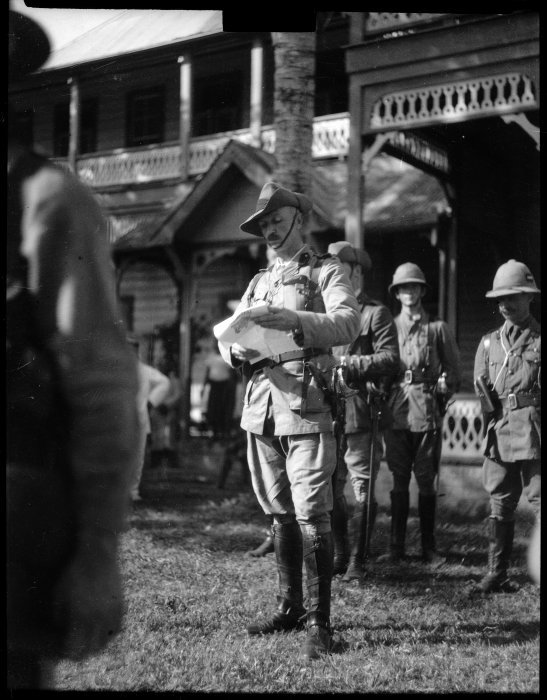
Colonel Robert Logan reading a proclamation in Apia, Samoa, on 29 August 1914, the day he assumed responsibility as military administrator

Logan was appointed commander of what was designated the Samoa Expeditionary Force (SEF). By 11 August 1914, the SEF consisted of over 1,400 personnel including three companies of infantry and a company of field engineers. It departed New Zealand on 15 August in a convoy of troopships escorted by the cruisers Philomel, Pyramus and Psyche. After stopping at Nouméa in New Caledonia, where the convoy was joined by the battlecruiser HMAS Australia, the cruiser HMAS Melbourne and the French cruiser Montcalm, the SEF went on to Fiji. Here several Legion-of-Frontiersmen and Samoan chiefs joined the SEF and it then sailed for Samoa on 27 August.

Despite concerns that Vizeadmiral (Vice Admiral) Maximilian von Spee's Pacific Squadron of two armoured cruisers would interfere with proceedings, the SEF arrived at the capital of Samoa, Apia, on 29 August. It made an unopposed landing, covered by the guns of the accompanying escorts, and secured the Government offices in the town as well as the wireless station several miles away. Logan, now the Military Administrator of Samoa with the island's governor a prisoner of war, oversaw the official raising of the Union Jack flag the following day, formally declaring the occupation of Samoa.

Logan remained the Military Administrator and British representative to Samoa until the end of the war. At the time of its seizure, Samoa was politically stable and its economy was based on its plantations which were mainly German owned. Apart from replacing most of the key officials, who were Germans, with New Zealanders, he largely followed existing policies but over time made a series of misjudgements. The German-owned plantations were allowed to continue to operate but only to trade with neutral or Allied countries. By 1916, most of the larger plantations were seized and placed into receivership when it was discovered that they were still trading with German companies. This placed considerable financial stress on the economy. Not long into Logan's administration, an uprising of Chinese labourers, who complained about their rations, had to be suppressed. He continued to restrict their civil liberties and over time most were repatriated back to China.

By not implementing quarantine procedures for the arrival of the SS Talune from Auckland on 7 November 1918, which was allowed to berth by Logan without quarantine precautions, he significantly mishandled the arrival of the influenza pandemic in November 1918. The Royal Commission of Inquiry into the Epidemic concluded that there had been no epidemic of pneumonic influenza in Western Samoa before her arrival. The epidemic resulted in over 7,500 deaths, or over 20% of Samoa's population at the time. In the meantime, neighbouring American Samoa was quarantined by its Governor, John Martin Poyer, and consequently had no influenza deaths. Logan declined medical help from American Samoa and was critical of the Samoans on account of believing them to not being willing to help themselves.

Decorated by the British and French governments for his war services, Logan was made a Companion of the Order of the Bath in the 1917 New Year Honours. He was later awarded the Croix de Chevalier of the Légion d'honneur in December 1919 "in recognition of valuable services in Samoa during the first year of the military occupation of that territory."

Logan returned to New Zealand in January 1919. Although his temporary rank of colonel had been made substantive in 1915, he received no further promotions. He was condemned for negligence in handling of the influenza outbreak by a New Zealand commission of inquiry. His relatively harsh administration, and the errors he made, greatly affected Samoan relations with New Zealand.

== Later life ==
Discharged from the NZEF in September 1919, Logan returned to his duties with the New Zealand Staff Corps but after a few months he was posted to the retired list. He chose to retire to England, settling on an estate he purchased in Devon. Beginning to develop a tendency to exaggerate his contributions to the war effort, he wrote a foreword to a history of the Samoa Expeditionary Force, which was published in 1924. In 1928, Logan moved to Scotland, taking up a family estate in Lanarkshire upon the death of his cousin. He died in Seaton, in the county of Devon, on 4 February 1935, but was buried in the family crypt in Lanarkshire.
