= Foreign relations of the Axis powers =

World War II-era relations

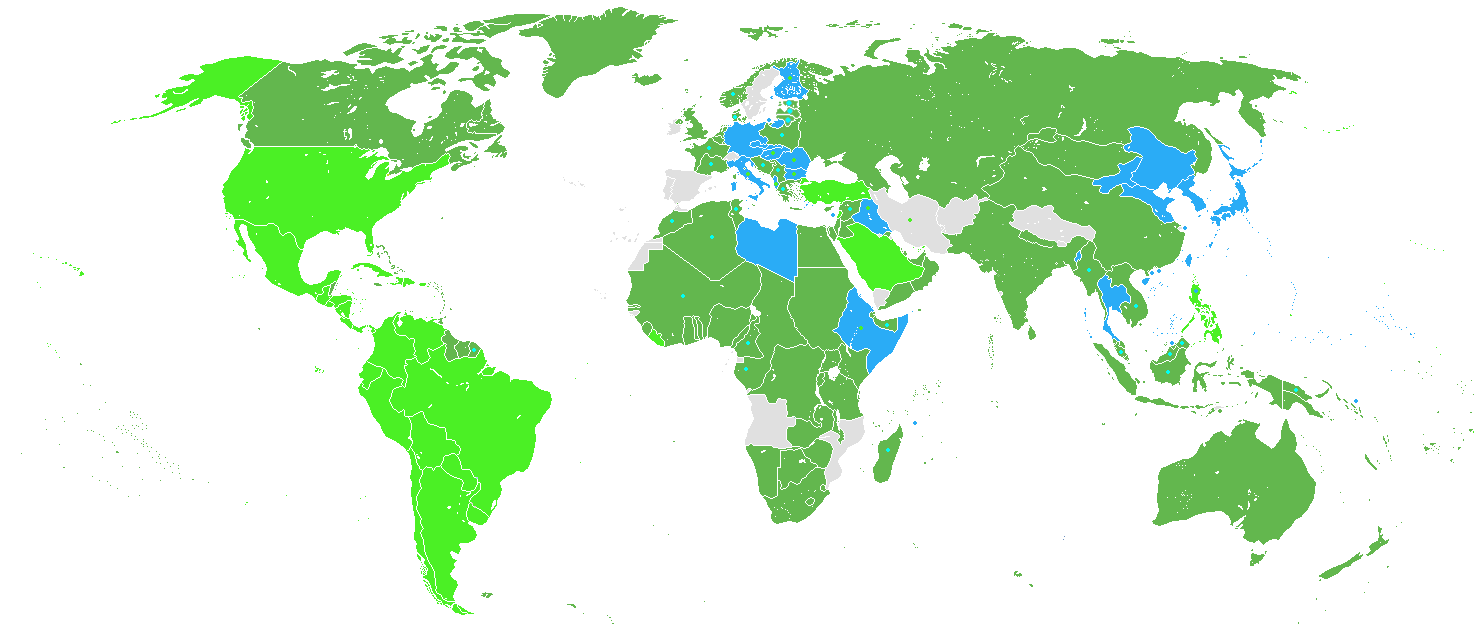
World Map with the participants in World War II. Allies before the attack on Pearl Harbor Allies that joined after Pearl Harbor Axis Powers Neutral Powers

Foreign relations of the Axis powers includes states which were not officially members of the Axis but had relations with one or more Axis members.

== Europe ==
=== Andorra ===
During the Second World War, Andorra remained neutral but was an important smuggling route between Vichy France and Spain.

=== Austria ===
On February 12, 1934, the new Austrofascist regime provoked the Austrian Civil War by ordering search warrants for the headquarters of the socialist party. At that time the socialist party structures were already weakened and the uprising of its supporters was quickly defeated. Subsequently, the socialist party and all its ancillary organisations were banned.

On May 1, 1934, the Engelbert Dollfuss cabinet approved a new constitution that abolished freedom of the press, established a one party system (known as "The Patriotic Front") and created a total state monopoly on employer-employee relations. This system remained in force until the Anschluss in 1938, when Austria became part of Nazi Germany. The Patriotic Front government frustrated the ambitions of Nazi sympathisers in Austria who wished both political influence and unification with Germany, leading to the assassination of Dollfuss on July 25, 1934. His successor Kurt Schuschnigg maintained the ban on Nazi activities in Austria, but was forced to resign on March 11, 1938, following a demand by Hitler for power-sharing with pro-German circles.

On March 12, German troops entered Austria, who met celebrating crowds, in order to install Nazi puppet Arthur Seyss-Inquart as Chancellor. With a Nazi administration in place and the country integrated into Nazi Germany, a referendum on April 10 approved the annexation with a majority of 99.73%.

As a result, Austria ceased to exist as an independent country during World War II. Technically, this annexation was forced by military invasion, but large parts of the Austrian population were in favour of the Nazi regime. The large Jewish population (about 200,000 Jews were living in Vienna at that time), which had had considerable significance for science and culture at that time, was killed or forced into exile, as were many socialist and Catholic Austrian politicians. Approximately 1.2 million Austrians either volunteered or were drafted into the Wehrmacht, of which about 250,000 were killed. Nearly 67,000 Austrians served in the Waffen SS, a disproportionately high number viz. its population compared with Germany's at the time. Austrian troops made up the bulk of seven alpine and infantry divisions, three armoured divisions and three garrison divisions.

=== Belarus ===
During World War II, the Nazis attempted to establish a Belarusian puppet state, led by collaborationist Belarusian Central Rada, with symbols similar to the short-lived Democratic Republic of Belarus. The Germans imposed a brutal racist regime, burning down some 9,000 Belarusian villages, deporting some 380,000 people for slave labour, and killing hundreds of thousands more civilians.

Almost the entire, previously very numerous, Jewish population of Belarus that had not been evacuated, was killed. One of the first uprisings of a Jewish ghetto against the Nazis occurred in 1942 in a small Polish town of Łachwa (now Lakhva, Belarus).

=== Belgium ===
Before the occupation of Belgium by Germany, Belgium withdrew from its alliance with France and declared itself neutral, compromising the Maginot line in the process. King Leopold III of Belgium choose to remain in the country, rather than going into exile. Around 15,000 Belgians served in two separate divisions of the Waffen-SS, divided along linguistic lines.

During the late 1930s through 1945, Belgium had many fascist groups and parties, such as Vlaamsch Nationaal Verbond and many others. Nazi Germany and fascist groups had moved to Belgium to establish a fascist party in Belgium. They had some success; Belgium decided not to go with any Axis powers.

=== Channel Islands ===
While the German Army was preparing to land an assault force of two battalions to capture the Channel Islands, a reconnaissance pilot landed in Guernsey on June 30, 1940, to whom the island officially surrendered. Jersey surrendered on July 1. Alderney, where no one remained, was occupied on July 2, and a small detachment travelled from Guernsey to Sark which officially surrendered on July 4. In Guernsey, the bailiff, Sir Victor Carey and the States of Guernsey handed overall control to the German authorities. Day-to-day running of island affairs became the responsibility of a Controlling Committee, chaired by Ambrose Sherwill.

The policy of the island governments, acting under instructions from the British government communicated before the occupation, was one of passive co-operation, although this has been criticised because of the deportation of Jews from the islands. Some island women fraternised with the occupying forces, although this was frowned upon by the majority of islanders, who gave them the derogatory nickname "Jerry bags".

=== Czech Republic ===
Bohemia and Moravia were occupied and declared a protectorate of Germany and were placed under the supervision of the Reichsprotektor, which position held consecutively several people. Emil Hácha remained as technical head of state with the title of State President; German officials staffed departments analogous to cabinet ministries, while small German control offices were established locally. The Gestapo assumed police authority. Jews were dismissed from the civil service and placed in an extralegal position. Political parties were banned, and many democratic politicians fled to France and United Kingdom where they established anti-Nazi government in exile. Many Communist Party leaders fled to the Soviet Union.

The population of the protectorate was mobilised for labour that would aid the German war effort, and special offices were organised to supervise the management of industries important to that effort. Czechs were drafted to work in coal mines, the iron and steel industry, and armaments production; some young people were sent to Germany. Consumer goods production, much diminished, was largely directed toward supplying the German armed forces. The protectorate's population was subjected to strict rationing.

=== Denmark ===
On May 31, 1939, Denmark and Germany signed a treaty of non-aggression, which did not contain any military obligations for either party. On April 9, 1940, citing intended British mining of Norwegian and Danish waters as a pretext, Germany occupied both countries. King Christian X and the Danish government, worried about German bombings if they resisted occupation, accepted "protection by the Reich" in exchange for nominal independence under German military occupation, thereby ending the fighting in Denmark already on the day of the invasion. Three successive Prime Ministers, Thorvald Stauning, Vilhelm Buhl and Erik Scavenius, maintained this samarbejdspolitik ("cooperation policy") of collaborating with Germany.

Denmark coordinated its foreign policy with Germany, extending diplomatic recognition to Axis collaborator and puppet regimes and breaking diplomatic relations with the "governments-in-exile" formed by countries occupied by Germany. Denmark broke diplomatic relations with the Soviet Union and signed the Anti-Comintern Pact of 1941.

In 1941, a Danish military corps, Frikorps Danmark was created at the initiative of the SS and the Danish Nazi Party, to fight alongside the Wehrmacht on Germany's Eastern Front. A government statement following the formation of the Frikorps was widely interpreted as a sanctioning of the corps. Frikorps Danmark was open to members of the Danish Royal Army and those who had completed their service within the last ten years. Between 4,000 and 10,000 Danes joined the Frikorps Danmark, including 77 officers of the Royal Danish Army. An estimated 3,900 Danes died fighting for Germany during the Second World War.

Denmark transferred six torpedo boats to Germany in 1941, although the bulk of its navy remained under Danish command until the declaration of martial law in 1943.

Denmark supplied agricultural and industrial products to Germany as well as loans for armaments and fortifications. The German presence in Denmark, including the construction of the Danish part of the Atlantic Wall fortifications, was paid from an account in Denmark's central bank, Nationalbanken. The Danish government had been promised that these expenses would be repaid later, but this never happened. The construction of the Atlantic Wall fortifications in Jutland cost 5 billion Danish kroner.

The Danish protectorate government lasted until August 29, 1943, when the cabinet resigned following a declaration of martial law by occupying German military officials. The Danish navy managed to scuttle 32 of its larger ships to prevent their use by Germany. Germany succeeded in seizing 14 of the larger and 50 of the smaller vessels and later to raise and refit 15 of the sunken vessels. During the scuttling of the Danish fleet, a number of vessels were ordered to attempt an escape to Swedish waters, and 13 vessels succeeded in this attempt, four of which were larger ships. By the autumn of 1944, these ships officially formed a Danish naval flotilla in exile In 1943, Swedish authorities allowed 500 Danish soldiers in Sweden to train themselves as "police troops". By the autumn of 1944, Sweden raised this number to 4,800 and recognised the entire unit as a Danish military brigade in exile. Danish collaboration continued on an administrative level, with the Danish bureaucracy functioning under German command.

Active resistance to the German occupation among the populace, virtually nonexistent before 1943, increased after the declaration of martial law. The intelligence operations of the Danish resistance was described as "second to none" by Field Marshal Bernard Law Montgomery after the liberation of Denmark.

=== Estonia ===
After Nazi Germany invaded the Soviet Union on June 22, 1941, and the Wehrmacht reached Estonia in July 1941, most Estonians greeted the Germans with relatively open arms and hoped for restored independence but it soon became clear that sovereignty was out of the question. Estonia became a part of the German-occupied "Ostland". A Sicherheitspolizei (secret police) was established for internal security under the leadership of Ain-Ervin Mere.

A conscript Waffen-SS Estonian unit that eventually became a full-sized Waffen-SS division, the 20th Waffen Grenadier Division of the SS (1st Estonian), was formed in 1944. The Estonian units saw action defending the Narva line throughout 1944.

Estonia had a Jewish population of 4,300 people before the war. Most of the Jews were deported to Siberia along with other Estonians by the Soviets. It is estimated that a few thousand Estonian Jews suffered this fate. Out the approximately 4,300 Jews in Estonia prior to the war, 950 Jews were caught by the Nazis. Round-ups and killings of Jews began immediately following the arrival of the first German troops in 1941, who were closely followed by the extermination squad Sonderkommando 1a, part of Einsatzgruppe A.

=== France ===
Before the Battle of France, France had signed the Munich Agreement which would allow Hungary and Nazi Germany, 2 Axis powers, and Poland, an allied power which also had a relationship, to take over Czechoslovakia in 1938.

=== Greece ===
Despite the fact that the vast majority of Greece's leaders, clerics, population, military, and persons on both left and right political spectrum resisted the Italian, German, and Bulgarian occupation, a small group of sympathisers, including the puppet governments of the Quisling Prime Ministers Georgios Tsolakoglou, Konstantinos Logothetopoulos and Ioannis Rallis emerged. From 1941 to 1944 the collaborationist governments and sympathisers comprising the infamous "Security Battalions" (Greek: Ταγματασφαλίτες, Tagmatasfaletes) fought against the guerrilla forces of both the rightist and leftist factions of the Greek Resistance. These were widely reviled in colloquial Greek as Germanotsoliades (Greek: Γερμανοτσολιάδες, literally meaning "German Tsolias").

=== Ireland ===
Éire, as the Republic of Ireland was known at the time, was officially neutral during the war. Northern Ireland was part of the United Kingdom. In 1939–40, Germany attempted to infiltrate spies into the UK by way of Éire, but these attempts consistently failed (see Operation Lobster and Operation Seagull).

During the period 1939–43, German intelligence, the Abwehr made attempts to foster intelligence-gathering links with the Irish Republican Army (IRA), but found that the IRA was in no condition to be of serious use. IRA members such as Francis Stuart did travel to Germany for discussions, although these were largely ineffectual.

The German military also drew up plans detailing how an invasion of Ireland might take place. These plans were titled Plan Green and any invasion was to act as a diversionary attack in support of a main attack to conquer Britain titled Operation Sea Lion. Both of these plans were shelved by 1942. Germans also came to Ireland, the most notable of whom was Hermann Görtz, who was captured in possession of "Plan Kathleen" — an IRA plan that detailed a Nazi supported invasion of Northern Ireland.

On the occasion of the death of Adolf Hitler, Irish Taoiseach (Prime Minister) Éamon de Valera paid a controversial visit to German ambassador Eduard Hempel to express sympathy with the German people over the death of the führer.

A few Irish people served in German forces; for example, James Brady and Frank Stringer served in SS-Jagdverband Mitte during 1944-1945. After the war, they were court-martialed and imprisoned by the British, who prosecuted them since they had been serving in the British Army before they defected. And a third person, Patrick O'Neill, an Irish doctor, may have served in SS-Sturmbataillon 500.

Conversely more than 40,000 Irish fought alongside the British during the war, including the youngest ever RAF Wing Commander in history Fighter ace Paddy Finucane. Éire produced British materiel under contract and was bombed during the war by the Luftwaffe in the Bombing of Dublin in World War II despite Éire's neutral status. Fear of the British Plan W for a re-invasion of Ireland spurred Irish preparations for defence of the island against the possibility of a German or British attack. Later in the war when the threat of a British invasion subsided The Irish government allowed RAF planes to fly the Donegal Corridor beginning in 1941. This was a contravention of Irish neutrality and was thus not publicised at the time.

Ireland ended World War II as one of only five (non micro-state) European Countries to avoid entering the war.

=== Latvia ===
German troops occupied Riga on July 1, 1941. Immediately after the instalment of German authority, a process of eliminating the Jewish and Roma population began, with many killings taking place in Rumbula. The killings were committed by the Einsatzgruppe A, the Wehrmacht and Marines (in Liepāja), as well as by Latvian collaborators, including the 500–1,500 members of the infamous Arājs Commando, which alone killed around 26,000 Jews, and the 2,000 or more Latvian members of the SD. By the end of 1941 almost the entire Jewish population was killed or placed in the death camps. In addition, some 25,000 Jews were transported to Latvia from Germany, Austria and the present-day Czech Republic, of whom around 20,000 were killed. The Holocaust claimed approximately 85,000 lives in Latvia.

=== Liechtenstein ===
In 1939, the German National Movement in Liechtenstein carried out a pro-Nazi coup, hoping to provoke Nazi Germany's annexation of the country. However, the coup was aborted after opponents blocked the participants off.

According to some sources Prince Franz I of Liechtenstein — the absolute monarch of the small principality — was antipathetic to Nazism because his consort, Elisabeth (née von Gutmann), was Jewish. Franz I died in 1938 and was succeeded by Franz Joseph II. Liechtenstein remained neutral throughout World War II, and its neutrality was never violated by any of the combatants. However, two factors have linked the Liechtensteinian state to the Axis cause:

In 2005, it was revealed that Franz Josef II profited directly from the Holocaust. Labourers from the Strasshof concentration camp, provided by the SS, had worked on estates in Austria owned by the Liechtensteinian royal house. The family also bought property in Austria and Czechoslovakia which had been taken from Jews by the Nazis.

At the end of the war, Liechtenstein gave asylum to about 500 soldiers of the First Russian National Army, which had been recruited by the German Wehrmacht from Soviet POWs.

=== Lithuania ===
After the German invasion, Lithuanians soon realised that the Nazis had no plans for an independent or even autonomous Lithuania and, in fact, they viewed the natives as second-class citizens. Lithuania lost its independence completely, and economic conditions were harsh, especially in cities and towns (in villages people were at least able to grow food for themselves).

There was substantial cooperation between the German forces and some Lithuanians. The Lithuanian Activist Front group formed five police companies to assist in the occupation the country. Later, the units around Kaunas were incorporated into the Tautos Darbo Apsauga (National Labour Guard) and in Vilnius the Lietuvos Savisaugos Dalys (Lithuanian Self Defence). These were then joined into the Policiniai Batalionai (Lithuanian Police Battalions) called by the Germans the Schutzmannschaft, with a total of 8,388 men by August 1942. Another infamous unit was the Lithuanian Secret Police (Saugumo policija). Despite the fact that the purpose of their creation was different, these Lithuanian units participated in the Holocaust, especially within Lithuania (including the areas of Vilnius region that are now in Belarus).

=== Monaco ===
While Prince Louis II was strongly sympathetic to the French and later the Free French, he tried to keep Monaco neutral during World War II but supported the Vichy French government of his old army colleague, Marshal Philippe Pétain. Nonetheless, his tiny principality was tormented by domestic conflict partly as a result of Louis' indecisiveness, and also because the majority of the population was of Italian descent; many of them supported the fascist regime of Italy's Benito Mussolini.

In 1943, the Italian Army invaded and occupied Monaco, setting up a fascist puppet government. Soon after, following Mussolini's fall in Italy, the German Army occupied Monaco and began the deportation of the Jewish population. Among them was René Blum, founder of the Opera, who died in a Nazi concentration camp. Under Prince Louis' secret orders, the Monaco police, often at great risk to themselves, warned people in advance that the Gestapo was planning on arresting them. The country was liberated as German troops retreated.

=== Poland ===
Poland never accepted any offer of cooperation with the Axis, but it did claim a part of Czechoslovakia when the country was dissolved by two Central European Axis powers, Nazi Germany and Hungary in 1938. However, this action stemmed from an earlier border dispute, not from any ideological alignment with the Axis.

=== Portugal ===
António de Oliveira Salazar, the dictator of Portugal, was personally sympathetic to the Axis, but Portugal and the United Kingdom were bound by the world's oldest defence treaty, the Treaty of Windsor. After the UK invoked the treaty, a major Allied air and naval base was established in the Azores. Portugal, particularly Lisbon, was one of the last European exit points to the US, and a huge number of refugees found shelter in Portugal. Siding with the Axis would have meant that Portugal would have been at war with the United Kingdom, which would have threatened Portuguese Asian and African colonies, while siding with the Allies might prove to be a threat to Portugal itself, resulting in unrestricted submarine warfare and possibly even invasion if the pro-German Spain had joined the Axis. Portugal continued to export tungsten and other goods to both the Axis (partly via Switzerland) and Allied countries.

Portugal protested the occupation of Portuguese Timor by Australian forces in 1942, but did not actively resist. The colony was subsequently occupied by Japan. Timorese and Portuguese civilians assisted Allied commandos in resisting the Japanese. Portuguese Macau was not occupied by Japan unlike its neighbouring Hong Kong, and Portugal ended World War II one of the five (non micro-state) European countries that managed to avoid entering the war.

=== San Marino ===
San Marino was officially neutral in World War II. It was sympathetic to the Axis because it was ruled by the Sammarinese Fascist Party. However, German forces (the 993rd Panzergrenadier Regiment) retreated through the country in 1944 and were pursued by Allied forces (4th Indian Division). The Allied military forces remained only as long as militarily necessary which was only a few weeks. In all, the fighting killed about 60 inhabitants of San Marino.

=== Soviet Union ===
Relations between the Soviet Union and the major Axis powers were generally hostile before 1939. In the Spanish Civil War, the Soviet Union gave military aid to the Second Spanish Republic, against Spanish Nationalist forces, which were assisted by Germany and Italy. However the Nationalist forces were victorious. In 1938 and 1939, the USSR fought and defeated Japan in two separate border wars, at Lake Khasan and Khalkhin Gol. The Soviets suffered another political defeat when an ally, Czechoslovakia, was partitioned and partially annexed, by Germany, Hungary and Poland—with the agreement of Britain and France—in 1938–39.

There were talks between Soviet Union and United Kingdom and France for an alliance against the growing power of Germany but these talks failed. As a result, on August 23, 1939, the Soviet Union and Germany signed the Molotov–Ribbentrop Pact, which included a secret protocol whereby the independent countries of Finland, Estonia, Latvia, Lithuania, Poland and Romania were divided into spheres of interest of the parties.

On September 1, barely a week after the pact had been signed, the partition of Poland commenced with the German invasion. The Soviet Union invaded Poland from the east on September 17.

Soon after that, the Soviet Union occupied Estonia, Latvia and Lithuania, in addition, it annexed Bessarabia and Northern Bukovina from Romania. The Soviet Union attacked Finland on November 30, 1939, which started the Winter War. Finnish defence prevented a complete occupation of the country, but Finland was forced to cede strategically important border areas near Leningrad.

The Soviet Union supported Germany in the war effort against Western Europe through the German–Soviet Commercial Agreement with exports of raw materials (phosphates, chromium and iron ore, mineral oil, grain, cotton, rubber). These and other export goods were being transported through Soviet and occupied Polish territories and thereby circumvented the British naval blockade of Germany. The Soviet Union also aided the Nazis by setting up a naval base near Murmansk in support of Hitler's U-boat war against Britain. Germany ended the Molotov–Ribbentrop Pact by invading the Soviet Union in Operation Barbarossa on June 22, 1941. This resulted in the Soviet Union becoming one of the main members of Allies.

Germany then revived its Anti-Comintern Pact enlisting many European and Asian countries in opposition to the Soviet Union.

The Soviet Union and Japan remained neutral towards each other for most of the war per agreement in the Soviet–Japanese Neutrality Pact. In the weeks before a declaration of war, Japan was actively lobbying The Soviet Union to appeal to the western allies in hopes of achieving more favourable surrender conditions. The Soviet Union ended the Soviet-Japanese Neutrality Pact by invading Manchukuo on August 8, 1945, days before the ultimate Japanese capitulation, and the end of World War II.

=== Spain ===
Generalísimo Francisco Franco's Spanish State gave moral, economic, and military assistance to the Axis powers, while nominally maintaining neutrality. Franco described Spain as a "nonbelligerent" member of the Axis and signed the Anti-Comintern Pact of 1941 with Hitler and Mussolini.

Franco had won the Spanish Civil War with the help of Germany and Italy. Spain owed Germany over $212 million for supplies of matériel during the Spanish Civil War, and Italian combat troops had actually fought in Spain on the side of Franco.

When Germany invaded the Soviet Union in 1941, Franco immediately offered to form a unit of military volunteers to join the invasion. This was accepted by Hitler and, within two weeks, there were more than enough volunteers to form a division—the Blue Division (División Azul in Spanish) under General Agustín Muñoz Grandes.

Additionally, over 100,000 Spanish civilian workers were sent to Germany to help maintain industrial production to free up able bodied German men for military service.

Despite strong pro-Axis leanings, Spain managed to end World War II as one of only five (non-microstate) European countries to avoid entering the war.

=== Sweden ===
Perhaps the most important aspect of Sweden's relations with Nazi Germany before and during the Second World War was the extensive export of iron ore to be used in the German arms industry. As Germany's preparations for war became more apparent and the risk of another war became obvious, international interest in Swedish ore increased. Germany attempted to pressure Sweden into increasing their ore exports, but without success. However, relations between Germany and Sweden remained co-operative, as Sweden continued its exports off the record. In addition to iron ore, Germany required SKF Swedish ball bearings.

Already during the Norwegian campaign the Swedish Government gave the Wehrmacht access to the Swedish rail system, allowing the Germans to transfer 60 soldiers under the guise of red-cross personnel from the occupied areas in Southern Norway to the fighting at the Narvik front. Access to the Swedish railways was later granted on condition that the number of German soldiers travelling to occupied Norway would balance the number leaving (in practice this limitation would be ignored). Sweden also allowed German naval transports to take shortcuts across Swedish territorial waters in the Baltic Sea.

The most controversial transit of German troops through Sweden was that of a fully armed and equipped infantry division under the command of Erwin Engelbrecht from Norway to Finland during the German invasion of the Soviet Union in 1941. (see also Per Albin Hansson#The 1941 .22Midsummer Crisis.22)

Responding to German appeals for volunteers, between 130 and 300 Swedish citizens enlisted in the German Armed Forces (most of them served in the Waffen-SS) and saw combat on the Eastern Front. This was a choice made by individual Swedish citizens, and not Swedish government policy (foreign recruitment of volunteers was banned in Sweden). Some 1,600 Swedes served legally as volunteers during the Continuation War, where Finland fought on the side of the Axis against the Soviet Union. About 400 of this group consisted of regular officers on leave from the Swedish Army.

Despite all this, Sweden managed to survive World War II as one of only five (non micro-state) European nations to avoid entering the war.

=== Switzerland ===
During World War II, the Swiss franc was the only remaining major freely convertible currency in the world, and both the Allies and the Germans sold large amounts of gold to the Swiss National Bank. Between 1940 and 1945, the German Reichsbank sold 1.3 billion francs worth of gold to Swiss Banks in exchange for Swiss francs and other foreign currency. Hundreds of millions of francs worth of this gold was monetary gold plundered from the central banks of occupied countries. 581,000 francs of "Melmer" gold taken from Holocaust victims in Eastern Europe was sold to Swiss banks.

Switzerland, despite being 70% ethnic German (Alemannic—other ethnic groups included 19% French, 10% Italian, and 1% Rhaeto-Romansch) was determined to remain neutral during the war. The country had several distinct defensive advantages that could help make any incursions into its territory very difficult. Firstly, it is shaped rather like a bowl, with high mountains surrounding and making up its borders with neighbouring countries. There were only four passes by which an army could make an entrance, and the Swiss had already mined every railway tunnel with explosives. Any incursions by the Germans or Italians would be met by a sealed border. Secondly, the Swiss also maintained a very large reserve army—all able bodied men were not only required to serve their time, backed up by regular training—but were required to keep their military equipment in their own homes, to be ready to report to duty within 48 hours of call up. The Germans themselves estimated that any attack on Switzerland would likely result in a 4:1 casualty ratio against them.

Not that the Swiss went untested: in May 1940, Luftwaffe aircraft flew into Swiss airspace to attack French targets behind the lines and to test the Swiss response. Swiss-built Messerschmitt Bf 109s hurtled into squadrons of German Heinkel He 111 bombers and shot many of them down. The German pilots had assumed the Bf 109s to be German and took no evasive action at first, until they'd been pounced on. There were several other engagements between German and Swiss aircraft during the war. The Swiss also built the French-designed Morane-Saulnier M.S.406 under license. As for the Allies, American and British bombers occasionally strayed over Swiss territory earning potshots from Swiss anti-aircraft units or being escorted to the nearest runway by Swiss aircraft for impoundment. As sympathies for either side were to be found everywhere in Switzerland, how German or Allied aircrews were treated when apprehended depended on the sympathies of the captors. Some were beaten and kept in camps, others given a considerable amount of freedom.

Switzerland ended World War II as one of only five (non-microstate) European nations to avoid entering the war.

=== Turkey ===
Nazi Germany had no intention of occupying Turkey, even though its neighbours to the west were all occupied by the Axis (including Greece, while Bulgaria was allied with Germany). Franz von Papen, the German foreign minister, visited Ankara with hopes of persuading Turkey to join the Axis powers. This would have significantly shortened the Axis route through the Caucasus to the valuable Soviet oil fields in Baku. As it turned out, by 1942 the German Army was almost on Turkey's eastern doorstep, only a few miles from the Soviet-Turkish border as they pushed down into the Caucasus. However, the Soviet victory at Stalingrad and subsequent Eastern Front defeats caused the Germans to withdraw from the area.

Turkey decided to remain neutral so as not to alienate the Allies, however it also signed a neutrality pact with Germany. It also shipped chromium, a vital element in the production of planes, tanks and U-boats, to Nazi Germany until the Turkish declaration of war. Turkey was the last country during wartime to purchase military equipment from Germany, (Panzer III-IVs, Focke-Wulf Fw 190As, etc.). The Turks also purchased weapons from the Allies (Morane-Saulnier M.S.406s, Republic P-47 Thunderbolts).

Turkey, however did declare war on Germany at the very end of the conflict as a means of being allowed to join the postwar United Nations.

=== Ukraine ===
During World War II, some elements of the Ukrainian nationalist underground fought both the German and Soviet forces, forming the Ukrainian Insurgent Army in 1942, while other Ukrainians initially collaborated with the Nazis, having been ignored by all other powers. In 1941 the German invaders and their Axis allies initially advanced against desperate but unsuccessful efforts of the Red Army.

Initially, the Germans were received as liberators by many Ukrainians, especially in Western Ukraine which had only been occupied by the Soviet forces in 1939. However, German rule in the occupied territories eventually aided the Soviet cause. Nazi officials of conquered Soviet territories made little attempt to exploit the population of Ukrainian territories' dissatisfaction with Soviet political and economic policies. Instead, the Germans preserved the collective-farm system, systematically carried out genocidal policies against Jews, deported others (mainly Ukrainians and Poles) to work in Germany, and began a systematic depopulation of Ukraine to prepare it for German colonisation.

=== United Kingdom ===
In the UK, during the late 1920s and 1930s several individuals and groups sympathised with fascism. This included Rotha Lintorn-Orman members of the British Fascists, Arnold Leese member of the Imperial Fascist League, Oswald Mosley member of the British Union of Fascists, and William Joyce and John Beckett that were part of the National Socialist League.

In 1938 several western countries, including the UK signed the Munich Agreement with Nazi Germany. In this agreement Nazi Germany received a strategically important part from Czechoslovakia. This was criticised by many, including the USSR. This territory was important for Germany and it allowed Germany to be encircled by the Western Powers.

In the Far East in the same period certain individuals such as Puyi's tutor Reginald Johnston, chief of the British embassy guards in Tianjin Brigade General F.H. Burnell-Nugent, supported the Japanese plans related to the Mukden Incident, the creation of the puppet state of Manchukuo and the open Japanese intervention in Northeast China.

During the war several British prisoners of war were recruited into the auxiliary Waffen-SS unit the British Free Corps also known as the Legion Of Saint George. It was organised in January 1943 and was conceived by John Amery, son of Leopold Stennett Amery. Heinrich Himmler was interested in the concept and ordered more volunteers to be recruited, but only approximately 30 soldiers volunteered for this unit (including 3 Canadian, 3 Australians, 3 South Africans and 1 New Zealander). The unit never saw any action, but a few men from this unit are believed to have fought in the Battle of Berlin.

=== Vatican City ===
The Roman Question was solved on February 11, 1929, between the Holy See and the Kingdom of Italy. The treaty was signed by Benito Mussolini and Pietro Cardinal Gasparri on behalf of King Victor Emmanuel III and Pope Pius XI (1922–1939), respectively. The Lateran Treaty and the Concordat established the independent State of the Vatican City and granted Catholicism a special status in Italy.

The Holy See was one of few states that established diplomatic relations with the Japanese puppet state of Manchukuo.

=== Yugoslavia ===
Chetniks of Draža Mihajlović were recognised as a member of the Allies, but instead of fighting against Germans and Italians, they collaborated with them in a struggle against Yugoslavian partisans.

== Asia ==
=== Afghanistan ===
In Afghanistan, Mohammed Zahir Shah under the tutelage of his uncles and one of his cousins invited and received industrial support from Germany. By 1935, German engineers and businessmen had developed factories and hydroelectric projects within Afghanistan. Minor support from Japan and Italy was also expected.

Although Afghanistan declared their neutrality on August 17, 1940, the British and Soviets were still alarmed by the large number of German non-diplomatic personnel within the country. In October, both British and Soviet governments ordered that Afghanistan remove all Axis non-diplomatic personnel from the country. The Shah and his tutors regarded the demands as insulting and illegitimate, but they had taken note of the swift invasion of Iran conducted in August. Not wanting the same thing to happen to their country, they accepted the demands and began practicing absolute neutrality.

=== China ===
China enjoyed cordial relations with Germany after World War I, because Germany lost its colonial holdings in China with its defeat. China demanded German industrial expertise, while Germany saw China as a large market.

With the ascent of the Nazis in Germany in 1933, Germany entered intense cooperation with China, as the Nazis required Chinese raw materials for its planned economy, while Chiang Kai-shek sought German advice in reforming the military to resist the Japanese and the Communists. At the height of this cooperation, Sino-German exchange accounted for 17% of China's foreign trade and China was the third largest trading partner with Germany.

The cooperation of Nationalist China and Nazi Germany declined with the Second Sino-Japanese War in 1937, as Germany favoured Japan, its Anti-Comintern Pact ally, as a bulwark against the Soviet Union. Contacts persisted for some time, until July 1941, when Nazi Germany recognised the Japanese puppet Wang Jingwei Government, extinguishing ties with Chiang's government. Nationalist China formally declared war on Japan and Nazi Germany on December 9, 1941, after the Japanese attack on Pearl Harbor.

=== First Republic of Eastern Turkestan ===
The Turkish-Islamic First East Turkestan Republic had some links to the Axis Powers, because during 1930-37 the Axis wanted to exploit Pan-Islamic sentiments to create a pro-Axis client state in Central Asia as a way of checking Soviet influence in the area.

=== Indonesia ===
During the occupation, the Japanese encouraged and backed Indonesian nationalistic feeling, created new Indonesian institutions and promoted nationalist leaders such as Sukarno. In the decades before the war, the Dutch had been overwhelmingly successful in suppressing the small nationalist movement in Indonesia so the Japanese proved fundamental in preparing the coming Indonesian independence.

The Japanese regime perceived Java as the most politically sophisticated, but economically the least important area; its people were Japan's main resource. As such—and in contrast to Dutch suppression—the Japanese encouraged Indonesian nationalism in Java and thus increased its political sophistication (similar encouragement of nationalism in strategic resource-rich Sumatra came later, but only after it was clear the Japanese would lose the war). The outer islands under naval control, however, were regarded as politically backward but economically vital for the Japanese war effort, and these regions were governed the most oppressively of all. These experiences and subsequent differences in nationalistic politicization would have profound impacts on the course of the Indonesian Revolution in the years immediately following independence (1945–1950).

In addition to revived Indonesian nationalism, equally important for the coming independence struggle and internal revolution was the Japanese orchestrated economic, political and social dismantling and destruction of the Dutch colonial state.

In early 1929, during the so-called Indonesian National Revival, Sukarno and fellow Indonesian nationalist leader Mohammad Hatta (later vice president), first foresaw a war in the Pacific and the opportunity that a Japanese advance on Indonesia might present for the Indonesian independence cause. In February 1942 Imperial Japan invaded the Dutch East Indies quickly over-running outmatched Dutch forces who marched, bussed and trucked Sukarno three hundred kilometres to Padang, Sumatra. They intended on keeping him prisoner, but abruptly abandoned him to save themselves.

The Japanese had their own files on Sukarno and approached him with respect wanting to use him to organise and pacify the Indonesians. Sukarno on the other hand wanted to use the Japanese to free Indonesia: "The Lord be praised, God showed me the way; in that valley of the Ngarai I said: Yes, Independent Indonesia can only be achieved with Dai Nippon ...For the first time in all my life, I saw myself in the mirror of Asia."

Subsequently, indigenous forces across both Sumatra and Java aided the Japanese against the Dutch, but would not cooperate in the supply of the aviation fuel which was essential for the Japanese war effort. Desperate for local support in supplying the volatile cargo, Japan now brought Sukarno back to Jakarta. He helped the Japanese in obtaining its aviation fuel and labour conscripts, called sukarela in Indonesian and rōmusha in Japanese. Sukarno was lastingly ashamed of his role with the rōmusha. He also was involved with PETA and Heiho (Javanese volunteer army troops) via speeches broadcast on the Japanese radio and loud speaker networks across Java. By mid-1945 these units numbered around two million, and were preparing to defeat any Allied forces sent to re-take Java.

On November 10, 1943, Sukarno was decorated by the Emperor of Japan in Tokyo. He also became head of the Investigating Committee for Preparatory Work for Independence (BPUPK), the Japanese-organised committee established as the initial stage of the establishment of independence for the area under the control of the Japanese 16th Army. On September 7, 1944, with the war going badly for the Japanese, Prime Minister Koiso Kuniaki promised independence for Indonesia, although no date was set. This announcement was seen as immense vindication for Sukarno's collaboration with the Japanese.

=== Iran ===
Following Germany's invasion of the USSR in June 1941, the United Kingdom and the Soviet Union became allies. Although a neutral nation, Reza Shah Pahlavi had brought Iran closer to Germany. This concerned the British who feared that the Abadan Oil Refinery, owned by the Anglo-Iranian Oil Company, might fall into German hands — the refinery produced eight million tons of oil in 1940 and was thus a crucial part of the Allied war effort. For the Soviets, Iran was a country of extreme strategic importance. The German Wehrmacht was steadily advancing through the Soviet Union and there were few ways for the Allies to get desperately needed American Lend-Lease supplies to the Soviets.

In 1941 the Soviets and British jointly invaded Iran to prevent the Shah from joining the Axis orbit as neighbouring Iraq had done. Despite having an army of 125,000 men, the Iranians were poorly trained and led, and taken by surprise. Most units quickly surrendered. Conversely, the Imperial Iranian Navy, although tiny, did fight back fiercely against British naval units until quickly overwhelmed. The Shah abdicated and his son, Mohammad Reza Pahlevi, was kept in Allied custody until war's end.

For the rest of the war, Iran was a vital source of oil for the allies, and an important supply route for the Soviets. Many Polish emigres, initially captured by the Soviets in 1939 were released via Iran. Thousands of Iranians became extremely valuable labourers for the allies, driving trucks and providing supplies vital to the war effort.

=== Macau ===
Following the surrender of Hong Kong in December 1941, the Japanese decided not to formally occupy the Portuguese colony of Macau. The reason may have been that the Japanese respected Portuguese neutrality, but Japanese troops went in and out of Macau at will with little protest from Portuguese authorities. However, in spite of this situation, the Allied flags were allowed to be displayed in Macau at their respective consulates.

After August 1943, Japanese influence in Macau increased after they attacked and captured a British cargo ship, the Sian (or Xi'an), off the coast of Macau after killing 20 of its crew. The ship might have been carrying contraband war supplies for Nationalist Chinese Forces. It was after this incident that Japan ordered the government of Macau to accept Japanese "advisors" as an alternative to complete military occupation. Later, Japan became even more aggressive in ordering the Governor of Macau, Commander Gabriel Mauricio Teixeira, to recognise Japanese authority in South China. Furthermore, Japanese authorities ordered Portuguese troops to leave their barracks on Lappa Island, an island adjacent to Macau. The Japanese were also given the authority to conduct house-to-house searches.

Macau remained almost completely isolated from the outside world, but was never occupied by the Japanese forces during World War II. It remained neutral during the war, but was essentially out of contact with the Portuguese government in Lisbon. This prevented either reinforcement or withdrawal. The biggest problems facing the colonial authorities of Macau were caused by Chinese civilians taking refuge from the Japanese. Shortly after Portugal made the Azores available to Allied aircraft, a Portuguese gunboat docked in Macau was seized by the Japanese and renamed Maiko. At the end of World War II, after the Japanese surrender, Macau returned to its previous normality.

=== Tibet ===
Tibet's economic and foreign policy was influenced by Japan, and Japan sought admission of Tibet into the Greater East Asia Co-Prosperity Sphere.

== Americas ==
=== Argentina ===
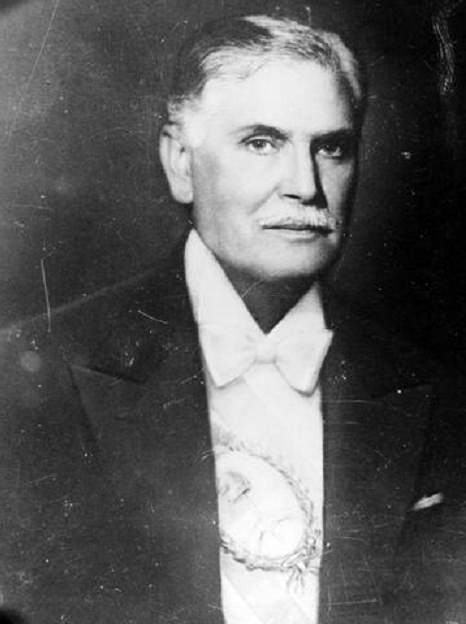
Ramón Castillo, President of Argentina, 1942–1943.

During the early years of World War II, Argentina maintained close relations with the Axis powers while officially remaining neutral. These close relations with the Axis irritated the United States, which cancelled weapons shipments to the country while increasing shipments to Argentina's neighbour, Brazil, in an attempt to pressure the Argentine government to abandon its ties with the Axis. Newly elected president Ramón Castillo drew Argentina closer to the Axis; in 1942, Argentina approached Germany with a request to purchase airplanes, weapons, and other equipment. Argentine General Domingo Martínez claimed that President Castillo was concerned over the country's relations with Brazil, with Argentina facing an ultimatum from the US. The Argentine government feared a potential invasion by Brazil, Chile and Uruguay backed by the US. Castillo was initially determined to resist, and openly joined the Axis, believing that Argentina's geography would allow it to withstand war. Upon Brazil joining the Allied powers in August 1942, Argentina declared itself a non-belligerent, while still negotiating with Germany for weapons. Castillo believed that the Axis would triumph in World War II.

In 1943 a military coup overthrew the Argentine government. A military junta was established, led by Pedro Pablo Ramírez. In 1944 the United States government labelled the Argentine government as "fascist" and enacted financial and trade restrictions against the country, urging other countries to do the same. British officials captured Argentina's envoy to Germany, creating a diplomatic disaster for Argentina. In January 1944, under pressure from Britain and the United States, Ramírez agreed to break all ties with the Axis powers. Argentine nationalists were alarmed by this concession and forced Ramírez to resign. For the remaining year of the war, the United States continued to maintain sanctions against Argentina due to its pro-Axis leanings. Argentina only declared war on Germany in 1945, about a month before the end of the war.

The close ties between Argentina and Nazi Germany proved controversial near the end of the war and afterwards, as Nazi personnel and capital began to arrive in Argentina in 1944.

=== Bolivia and Peru ===
Bolivia and Peru during the 1930s had some commercial links with Germany and Italy; these countries acquired a number of Focke-Wulf Fw 44 Stieglitz, Junkers Ju 86Ks, Junkers K 43s, and CV-33 tankettes, as well as other military and civilian equipment in first case, and examples of Caproni-Bergamaschi Ca.135 P.XI (Ca.135bis) in the latter case.

=== Brazil ===
Brazil, before and during the war, had commercial ties with Germany and Italy; for example, the country acquired German aircraft and weapons including Focke-Wulf Fw 200 B-1s, Focke-Wulf Fw 58 Weihes, Focke-Wulf Fw 44 Stieglitz, Junkers Ju 86Ks, CV-33 tankettes, Sd.Kfz. 6s, Sd.Kfz. 7s, and Sd.Kfz. 8s armoured vehicles. Brazil also acquired licenses for manufacturing some of these aircraft.

The Brazilian government of Getúlio Vargas was a totalitarian dictatorship of fascist inspiration. Brazil's biggest economic partner at the time was Nazi Germany, which was admired by many members of the government and the Armed Forces. Brazil's relations with Germany were so strong that, along with its strategic position in the Atlantic and its abundance of natural resources, the country was invited to officially join the Axis powers in 1937, to which it was denied fearing blockades and even an American invasion.

Before and during the war, there were some Brazilian political groups with native fascist doctrines like the Brazilian Integralist Action. The country as a whole declared war on the Axis in 1942 and sent the Brazilian Expeditionary Force to fight with the Allies in Europe.

=== Canada ===
Canada, though it entered the war in 1939 and was one of the first nations to declare war on the Axis, had a fascist movement throughout the 1930s through to 1940.

The Parti national social chrétien (known in English as the "Christian National Socialist Party") was a Quebec-based fascist and anti-semite party founded in February 1934. The party was led by Canadian Adrien Arcand. An admirer of Adolf Hitler, Arcand referred to himself as the "Canadian führer". In October 1934, the party merged with the "Canadian Nationalist Party", which was based in the Prairie provinces. In June 1938, it merged with Nazi and other racist clubs in Ontario and Quebec, many of which were known as Swastika clubs, to form the "National Unity Party" at a national convention held in Kingston, Ontario.

The only fascist politician ever elected in Canada was Peter M. Campbell of Alberta, who won Lethbridge in the 1937 Alberta election and formed the Alberta Unity Party.

However, all the parties were banned on May 30, 1940, under the Defence of Canada Regulations of the War Measures Act, and Arcand and many of his followers were arrested and detained for the duration of the war.

=== Chile ===
Chile despite orbit revolve more direct U.S. influence, maintained a neutral position throughout most of the development of this confrontation. However, when the defeat of the Axis was almost accomplished, due to international pressure Chile became part of the Allies and ended up declaring war on Germany, Italy and Japan. Chile only diplomatically participated in the war as not sent troops to the battlefield. Paradoxically, Chile to be belligerent to the Allied cause, was part of the countries that in 1945 gave birth to the United Nations (UN).

=== Costa Rica, El Salvador and the Dominican Republic ===
Before the creation of the Pan American Union mutual defence pact in July 1940 and entry into the war on the Allied side after the attack on Pearl Harbor, Costa Rica, El Salvador and the Dominican Republic offered diplomatic recognition of the Japanese puppet state of Manchukuo which was not recognised as a legitimate state by a majority of the world's nations at the time, including the United States.

=== Mexico ===
Mexico officially did not join the Axis and declined Germany's offers to take the Axis side during World War II. However, there were some Mexican citizens linked to the Spanish Fascist Party.

Some Mexican volunteers had helped Franco, but the Mexican state opposed the Nationalists in the Spanish Civil War. Manuel Ávila Camacho, the President of Mexico at the time, entered World War II on the Allied side late in the war.

=== United States ===
Officially, the United States did not favour any Axis member, but prior to the attack on Pearl Harbor in December 1941, there were some American businessmen linked with Japanese commerce and supporters of the Japanese cause in the country. For example, the 1939 Commerce Agreement permitted Thomas Lamont (from J.P. Morgan & Co.) to visit Japan and establish business with Count Aisuke Kabayama (of the Iron Manufacture Company of Japan), Fuji Fujizawa (charged with collecting scrap iron in United States) and Noburo Ohtani (President of N.Y.K. Lines) among others.

One supporter was George Bronson Rea, a former railway engineer and expert on Chinese affairs who in 1935 published "The Case for Manchukuo" (D. Appletone Century Co. New York), where he argued in favour of the Japanese protection of the Manchukuo puppet state.

During the war a few US POWs became members of the German armed forces, but no unit organised of American volunteers was ever raised. Five US citizens served in the Waffen-SS in May 1940; among them were Martin James Monti (from St. Louis), an SS Untersturmführer and Peter Delaney (a.k.a. Pierre de la Ney du Vair) (from Louisiana), SS-Haupsturmführer in Waffen-SS. Both served in the SS-Standarte Kurt Eggers unit, and Delaney is believed to later have served in the Légion des Volontaires Français (LVF). He met Monti and probably arranged for him to enter the Waffen-SS. Delaney was killed in 1945. Another eight American volunteers are known to have been killed in German service.

== Oceania ==
=== Australia ===
In the early 1930s, German immigrant, medical doctor, World War I veteran of the German Army and father of former South Australian Liberal politician, Heini Becker, Dr. Johannes Becker set up the Nazi Party in Australia. Based in Tanunda, South Australia, he became the leading Nazi Party organiser for Australia, gathering around a number of people, including a Lutheran pastor. Becker lost favour with the Nazi officials in Germany and was expelled from the party in 1941. Within the first few days of World War II, all members were interned as they were considered a risk to national security. Becker was labelled "Australia's No. 1 Nazi" and his organisation was known as The Hitler Club by Australian security operatives. A very small number of Australians were also believed to be recruited into the British Free Corps. Australia also produced its own fascist organisation, known as the Australia First Movement. Although not directly linked to Nazi Germany, Fascist Italy or Japan, it believed that greater links with the Axis nations would benefit Australia's long term interests. Unlike other right-wing organisations founded in Australia in the 1930s (such as the New Guard), which were essentially monarchist and pro-British Empire, the Australia First Movement was unique in that it proposed that the country become a republic as a future form of government.

=== Western Samoa ===
In the 1930s the former German colony of Western Samoa was under New Zealand Administration. On January 15, 1934, Mr. Alfred Matthes and E.W. Bohle were authorised to establish a short-lived branch of the National Socialist German Workers' Party in Western Samoa. Following this, they began to receive literature and printed propaganda from the Auslandsabteilung (Foreign Branch) of the Nazi Party in Hamburg.

On January 20, 1937, Matthes and Gerhard Stoeicht returned to Apia from the Nazi Party's World Congress organised in Hamburg, Germany. In the same year the German consul in Wellington visited the Nazi HQ in Apia. During the Sudeten crisis in 1938 the local Nazis became active again and apparently planned to seize some key government institutions. Later, Matthes went broke and Berlin dissolved the Samoan Nazi Party in April 1939.

Some documents that were found in Germany after the war proved that twelve Western Samoans had official NSDAP membership cards. Ten of them emigrated to New Zealand after the war.

== See also ==
- World War II
- Axis powers of World War II
- Collaboration with the Axis Powers during World War II
- Participants in World War II
- List of Pro-Axis Leaders and Governments or Direct Control in Occupied Territories
- Expansion plans of the Axis
- Expansion operations and planning of the Axis Powers

== Notes and references ==
- Elson, R. E. (October 2009). "Another Look at the Jakarta Charter Controversy of 1945". Indonesia (88): 105–130.
- Inomata, Aiko Kurasawa (1997). "Indonesia Merdeka Selekas-lekasnya: Preparations for Independence in the Last Days of Japanese Occupation". In Abdullah, Taufik (ed.). The Heartbeat of Indonesian Revolution. PT Gramedia Pustaka Utama. pp. 97–113. ISBN 979-605-723-9.
- Kusuma, A.B.; Elson, R.E. (2011), "A note on the sources for the 1945 constitutional debates in Indonesia" (PDF), Bijdragen tot de Taal-, Land- en Volkenkunde, 167 (2–3): 196–209, doi:10.1163/22134379-90003589, ISSN 0006-2294
- Lewis, Daniel K. (2001). The History of Argentina. New York; Hampshire: Palgrave MacMillan.
- Potash, Robert A. (1969). The Army And Politics in Argentina: 1928–1945; Yrigoyen to Perón. Stanford: Stanford University Press.
- Walters, Guy (2010). Hunting Evil: How the Nazi War Criminals Escaped and the Quest to Bring Them to Justice. New York: Broadway Books. ISBN 978-0-7679-2873-1.
