= Samoan branch of the Nazi Party =

Local branch of the Nazi Party (1934–1939)

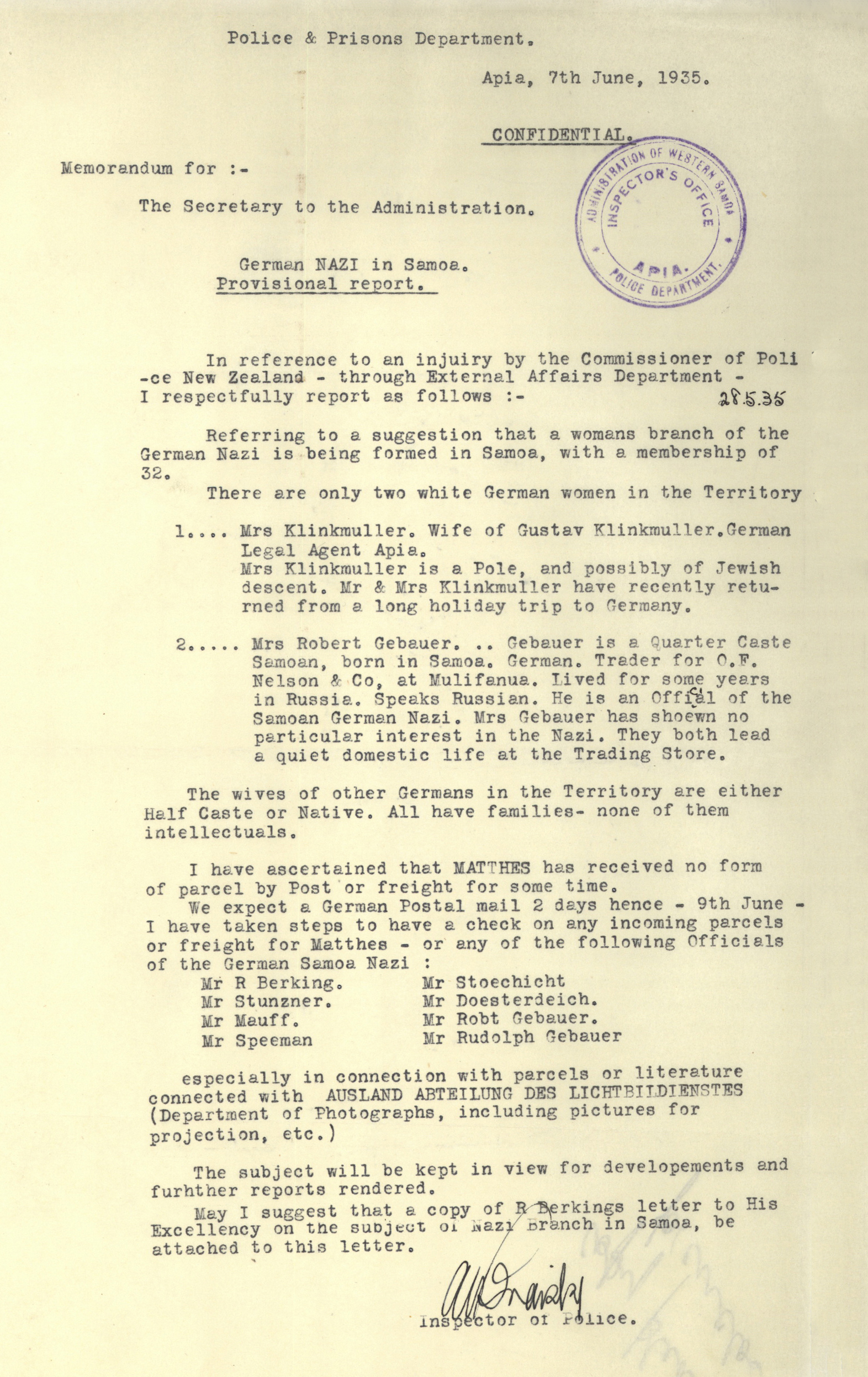
A 1935 Western Samoa police report on the possibility of white German women's membership of the party. It also lists eight party officials in addition to Matthes whose post was subject to interception and inspection.

A branch of the Nazi Party operated in the Territory of Western Samoa, a League of Nations mandate administered by New Zealand, from 1934 until 1939. It was founded by German settler Alfred Matthes following a visit by Reichsmarine cruiser Karlsruhe to the territory, which led a surge in German nationalism among Germans in Western Samoa who had settled there when it was a colony of Germany. Support for the Nazi Party was strongest among mixed-race settlers of German descent in the territory. The branch came into conflict with the Concordia Club, which was according to New Zealand police files favoured by white German settlers and supported closer relations with the United Kingdom, Switzerland and the Nordic states. This was a perception only, as both the Concordia Club and the NSDAP had German and Samoan-German members.

The branch was criticised by the German consul to New Zealand, Dr. Walter Hellenthal, over its poor organisation and the racial make-up of its members. Hellenthal recommended that the Nazi Party take steps to improve the organisation, and a party representative from Germany was sent to the territory, a young 29 year-old teacher, Paul Hessmann. Matthes responded to the snub by increasing his political activity, trying to establish a sister organisation among Samoans in the territory and promising a takeover by Germany, which did not eventuate.

The New Zealand Police monitored Matthes and considered him a harmless fool. When Matthes' prediction that Germany would annex the territory came to nothing, support for the branch dwindled. After petitions by the Germans of the Concordia club, and after Matthes' actions embarrassed the new consul, Ernest Ramm, during a December 1938 visit to the territory, Ramm recommended the branch be closed down. It was disbanded in April 1939, shortly before the outbreak of World War II.

== Foundation ==
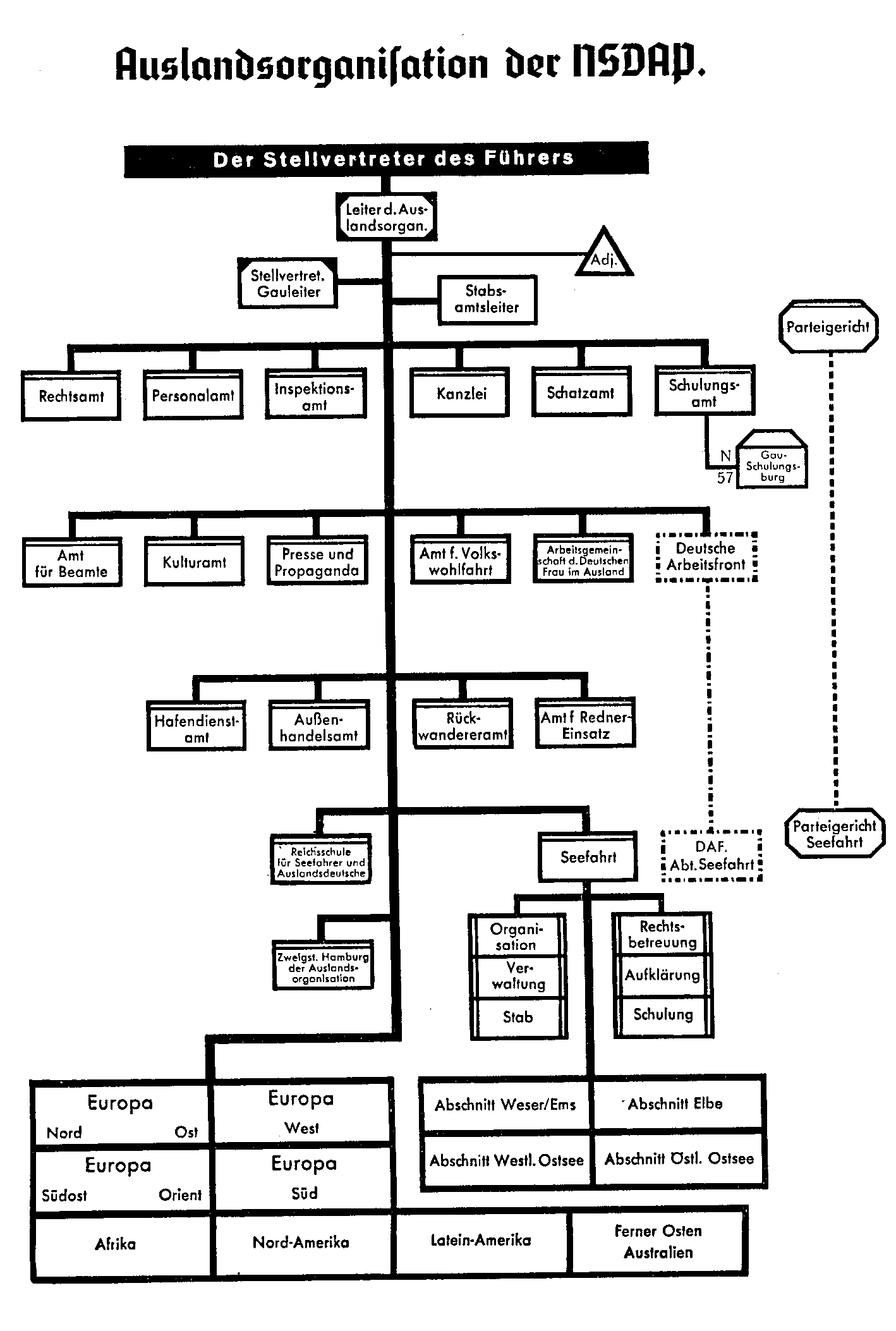
Samoa came under the Ferner Osten Australien ("Far East & Australia") branch of the Ausland-Organisation, shown at the bottom right of this 1937 organisation chart.

What is now Samoa became a German colony in the 19th century. At the start of the First World War it was occupied by New Zealand, from 29 August 1914. After the war it remained in New Zealand control as the Territory of Western Samoa, under a League of Nations mandate.

The islands retained a German settler presence, including Alfred Matthes, who had emigrated before the First World War and married a Samoan-Tongan woman. The National Socialist German Workers' Party (commonly known as the Nazi Party) under Adolf Hitler came to power in Germany in 1933. Matthes sought permission to establish a branch of the party in Samoa and received authorisation on 15 January 1934. In February the German cruiser Karlsruhe visited the territory. The visit provided an opportunity for residents of German origin to baptise their children and register their citizenship and led to a rise in German nationalism in Samoa.

The party branch was headquartered in the territorial capital, Apia. It was supported by literature and propaganda material sent by the Ausland-Organisation (foreign organisations) branch of the Nazi Party in Hamburg. Already in 1933 ex-colonial officers under the leadership by Schnee and Schulz-Ewert, had managed to convince the Department of the Interior to exempt Polynesians for the new race laws, as they were Aryan related. The Samoan branch sent documents to the Nazi Party headquarters to advocate for the classification of Polynesian people as members of the Aryan race. Samoan women who were the wives of German settlers, and therefore German nationals by marriage, were permitted to join the party on the basis that they were of an Aryan-related race; they may be the only recorded black Nazi party members.

== Conflict with the Concordia Club and German consul ==
The opening of the party branch split the settlers of German origin in Samoa. They divided between those associating with the existing Concordia Club and Matthes' organisation. The Concordia Club was led by Fritz Janke, a planter, and supported closer relations between the territory and Britain, Switzerland and the Nordic states. It had 31 members of German origin, with a strong support base among white settlers, and 27 associate members of foreign origin. The NSDAP branch tended to have greater support amongst mixed-race settlers, who were in the significant majority on the island (in 1937 there were 39 white and 497 mixed-race settlers of German origin). The party had 12 members in 1937, 10 having joined in 1935 and 2 in 1938. Both Matthes and Janke had married Polynesian women and had mixed-race children.

Matthes returned to Germany in 1936 to attend the Nazi Party's world congress in Hamburg; he returned to Samoa on 20 January 1937. Later that year a new German consul was appointed to New Zealand, Walter Hellenthal. He visited Samoa and found the party branch to be poorly organised; he also questioned the racial make-up of its membership. Hellenthal was asked by the members to clarify the party's position on mixed-race members with a view to any future application of the racist Nuremberg Laws. He replied that there was no fixed position with regard to German-Samoans and that each case would be decided on an individual basis. Privately Hellenthal wrote to the party in Germany to recommend that only those with less than one quarter Polynesian blood be considered Aryan.

Hellenthal disliked Matthes, perhaps because of his views on race or his lower-class origins. He favoured the Concordia Club with a generous donation of books from Germany and wrote to the Ausland-Organisation to recommend they take action to improve the Samoan branch of the party. In response a 29-year-old teacher, Paul Hessmann, was sent to Samoa to reform the German schools and make improvements to the branch.

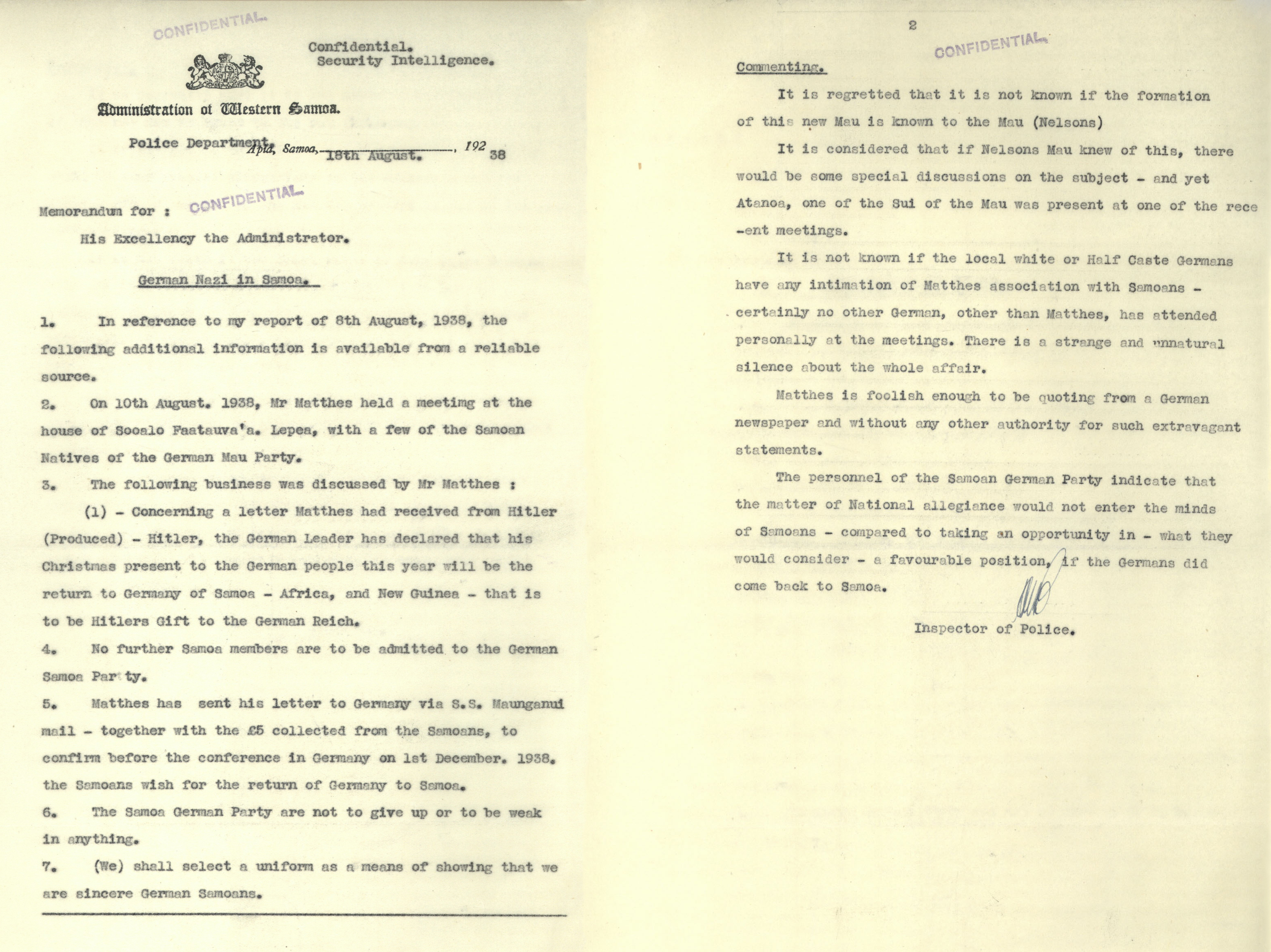
A 1938 Western Samoa police report on a meeting held by Matthes with the Polynesian sister organisation

Matthes responded to the snub from Hellenthal by increasing his political activity, attempting to convert existing anti-colonial sentiment into a pro-German one. He distributed propaganda, established a sister organisation to cater to Polynesians and made plans to overthrow the New Zealand administration of Samoa. During the September 1938 Munich Crisis, which followed the German occupation of the Sudetenland and raised fears of impending war, Matthes' organisation prepared, in case of war, to seize control of Samoa to make radio broadcasts across the Pacific. He was aware that they could not hope to retain control of the islands but hoped to secure a propaganda victory for Germany. During this time Matthes had the support of only five members of the party branch.

The New Zealand police had been keeping a close watch on Matthes. The External Affairs branch of the New Zealand government considered deporting him but the administrator of the territory, Alfred Turnbull, advised against this as he thought Matthes would be glad to be seen as a martyr for the Nazi cause. The New Zealand police inspector stationed in Samoa regarded Matthes as a "fool with a Hitler complex".

== Decline and closure ==
As part of his 1938 campaign Matthes had produced a letter in which he claimed Hitler promised that Samoa would be annexed to Germany by Christmas. Matthes said he had sent a reply confirming his members' wish for German government. Support for the party faltered when German warships failed to materialise. Hellenthal was replaced by Ernest Ramm in late 1938. He visited Samoa in December and was embarrassed to be met by Matthes and his supporters in uniform, giving a Nazi salute, as he had reassured Turnbull that his visit was purely cultural in nature. During the visit the Concordia Club faction requested that Ramm disband Matthes' organisation and he actioned this upon his return to Wellington.

The branch was disbanded in April 1939 at a time when Matthes, low on money, sought assistance from Ramm to arrange his return to Germany. The former president and secretary of the party branch were interned in New Zealand following the September 1939 entry of New Zealand into the Second World War.

== See also ==
- Germany–Samoa relations
