= Ukrainian People's Militsiya =

Ukrainian People's Militia
- Ukrainian: Українська Міліція; German: Ukrainische Miliz
- Active: 23 June 1941 – November 1941
- Country: Selected cities and rural areas of General Government and Reichskommissariat Ukraine

Ukrainian People's Militia (Ukrainian: Українська Народна Міліція, romanized: Ukrainska Narodna Militsiia) or the Ukrainian National Militia, was a paramilitary formation created by the Banderite faction of the Organization of Ukrainian Nationalists (OUN) in the General Government territory of occupied Poland and later in the Reichskommissariat Ukraine during World War II. It was set up in the course of Operation Barbarossa, the 1941 invasion of the Soviet Union.

== Formation ==
The creation of the Ukrainian People's Militsiya in June 1941 preceded the official founding of the Ukrainian Auxiliary Police in mid-August 1941 by Heinrich Himmler. There is conclusive historical evidence indicating that members of the Ukrainian Militsiya took a leading role in the 1941 Lviv pogroms, after the German army reached Lviv (Lwów, Lemberg) at the end of June in Soviet-occupied eastern Poland. Initially the Ukrainian Militsiya acted independently, with the blessings of the SS, but later were limited to joint operations (Aktionen) with German units or otherwise functioned directly under the Nazi command.

The Ukrainian People's Militsiya was active in occupied territories behind the Wehrmacht lines, assisting the German Security Police and the Einsatzgruppen while the army kept advancing in the direction of Zhytomyr, Rivne and Kiev.

Heinrich Himmler was appointed Chief of SS and Police for the Eastern Territories on 17 July 1941 and decreed the formation of the Schutzmannschaften from among the non-German auxiliaries. In mid-August he regrouped the indigenous Militsiya which had sprung up under military rule to form the core of the official Ukrainische Hilfspolizei. Before that, members of the Ukrainian Militsiya in formerly Polish cities with sizeable Polish-Jewish presence compiled lists of targets for the branch offices of the KdS and assisted with the roundups (as in Stanisławów, Włodzimierz Wołyński, Lutsk).^{[a]} In Korosten, the Militsiya rounded up 238 Jews described as "a source of continuous unrest" and carried out the killings by themselves. In Sokal, on 30 June 1941 they arrested and executed 183 Jews dubbed "the commissars". Other locations followed.

By 7 August 1941 stations of Ukrainian People's Militsiya were established in most areas conquered by the Wehrmacht including Lviv (Lwów, Lemberg), Tarnopol, Stanislavov (Stanisławów) (now Ivano-Frankivsk), Lutsk (Łuck), Rovno, Yavoriv, Kamenetz-Podolsk, Drohobych (Drohobycz), Dubno, Sambir, Kostopol, Sarny, Zolochiv, Berezhany, Pidhaytsi, Kolomyya, Rava-Ruska, Radekhiv, Terebovlia, Zbarazh, Zhytomyr, Fastov and others.

== Ukrainian People's Militsiya instructions ==
The stated duty of the Ukrainian People's Militsiya was to maintain order in the newly occupied territories by defending the Ukrainian population from attacks by scattered remnants of the Red Army, killing resistance members or Soviet parachutists caught behind the German lines, confiscating weapons, registering former communist officials or specialists brought into western Ukraine from eastern regions, and shooting looters or those caught hiding firearms as well as collaborators with the Soviet state and the Soviet diversionaries. The regulations of the Ukrainian People's Militsiya allowed Jews to join in but only under strict rules requiring them to wear yellow stars on their clothing. Poles and Russians were expressly prohibited from joining the force.

The OUN controlling the Ukrainian People' Militsiya was strongly opposed to the Soviet power structure that had been established in Galicia after the Soviet annexations, particularly the NKVD. The command sought to neutralize those particular elements that the OUN felt were critical to projecting Soviet power over Ukraine. Instructions issued in May 1941 by OUN in Distrikt Galizien were very specific about who the enemy was.

There are elements that give support to the Soviet regime and NKVD, which, with the creation of the new revolutionary power in Ukraine must be neutralized (i.e. liquidated; унешкідливлені). These elements are:

1. The Muscovites (Russians) sent to Ukrainian lands in order to strengthen Moscow's power in Ukraine
2. The Jews, individually and as a national group
3. The foreigners, mostly Asians, which Moscow uses to colonize Ukraine in order to turn the country into an ethnic chessboard
4. The Poles on the West Ukrainian lands who have not given up the dream to build a Greater Poland at the expense of the Ukrainian lands, even if Greater Poland will become Red.

The objectives of the People's Militsiya were to facilitate the eradication of the suspected members of the NKVD and the Communist Party including Soviet prosecutors or citizens who during the Soviet rule collaborated with them. All prominent non-Ukrainians were to be interred. The People's Militsiya – according to instructions – were advised to act in such way that "the army and the authorities of the ally" (i.e. the German Security Police and the Gestapo) would draw obvious benefits from the existence of the People's Militsiya."

== State security department of the Militsiya ==
On 25 June 1941 Yaroslav Stetsko wrote to Stepan Bandera that the OUN-B was "forming a militia to help eliminate the Jews". On 2 July 1941 the Ukrainian People's Militsiya was established by Stetsko and his group of OUN supporters in Lviv, and was placed under the command of the German Security police and the Gestapo.

The Ukrainian People's Militsiya structure also included a "political department" similar to the Gestapo (familiar to the OUN-R organization) named the "Secret State Police ".

If available, personnel of Bandera's OUN People's Militsiya were to use captured Soviet Army uniforms with a yellow-blue armband worn on the left sleeve. If such military clothing was not on hand, members were to wear a white armband stamped with the name People's Militsiya (Народна Міліція).

== See also ==
- OUN
- Ukrainian Insurgent Army
- Banderites
- Cases of controversial relations with the Axis of World War II
- Collaboration with the Axis Powers during World War II
- Holocaust in Poland
- Holocaust in Ukraine
- Responsibility for the Holocaust
- Schutzmannschaft
- Ukrainian-German collaboration during World War II

== Footnotes ==
a. The KdS stands for the Kommandateur der Sicherheitspolizei und des SD, or the Regional Command of the Sipo (Sicherheitspolizei) and SD (Sicherheitsdienst, the intelligence branch of the SS).
