= Germany–Samoa relations =

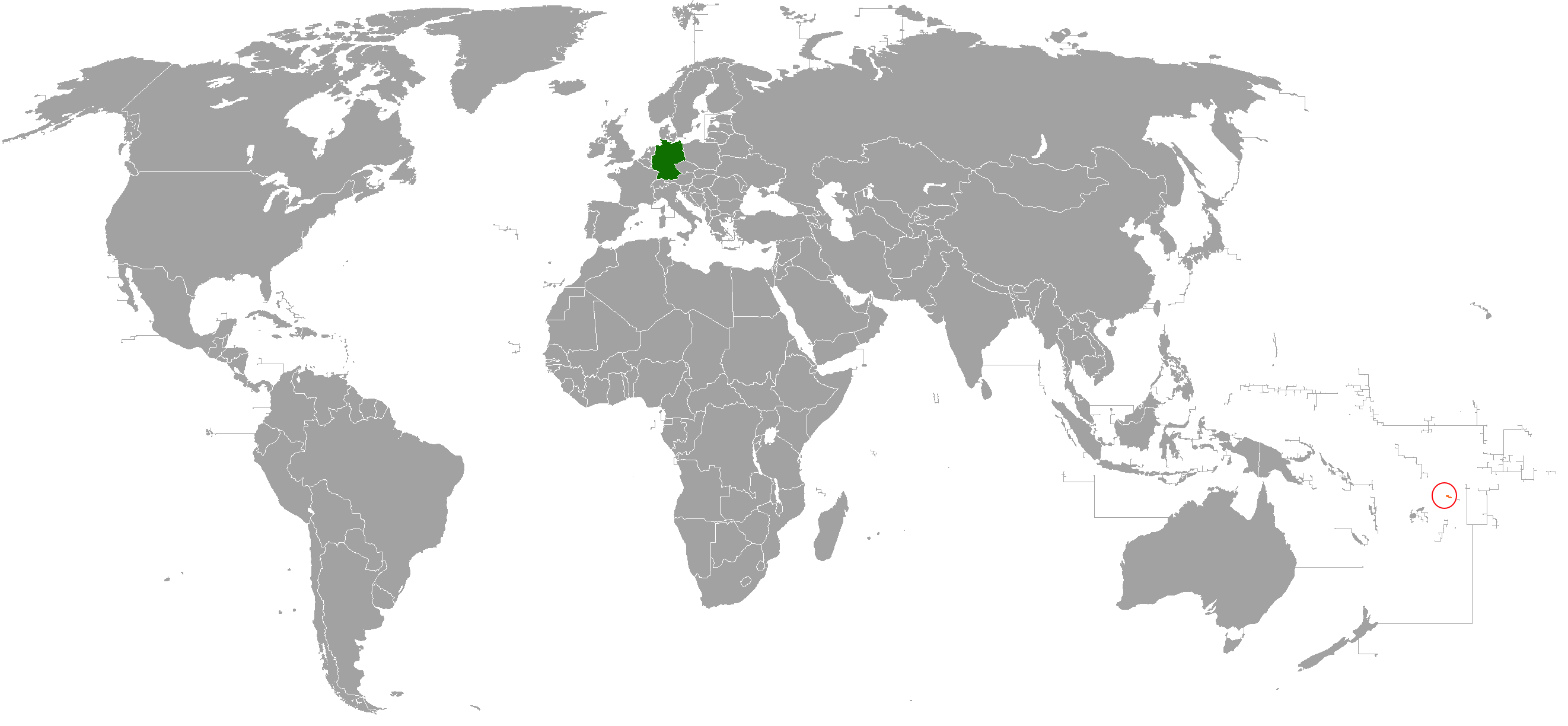

- Germany: Samoa

Diplomatic mission
- Embassy of Germany, Wellington: Embassy of Samoa, Brussels

Bilateral foreign relations between Germany and Samoa date back to the nineteenth century. Samoa, a former colony of the German colonial empire, has maintained diplomatic relations with the modern state of Germany since they were established with West Germany in 1972. In modern times, Germany helps Samoa fight climate change and provided aid during the COVID-19 pandemic in Samoa.

== History ==
=== Imperial Germany ===
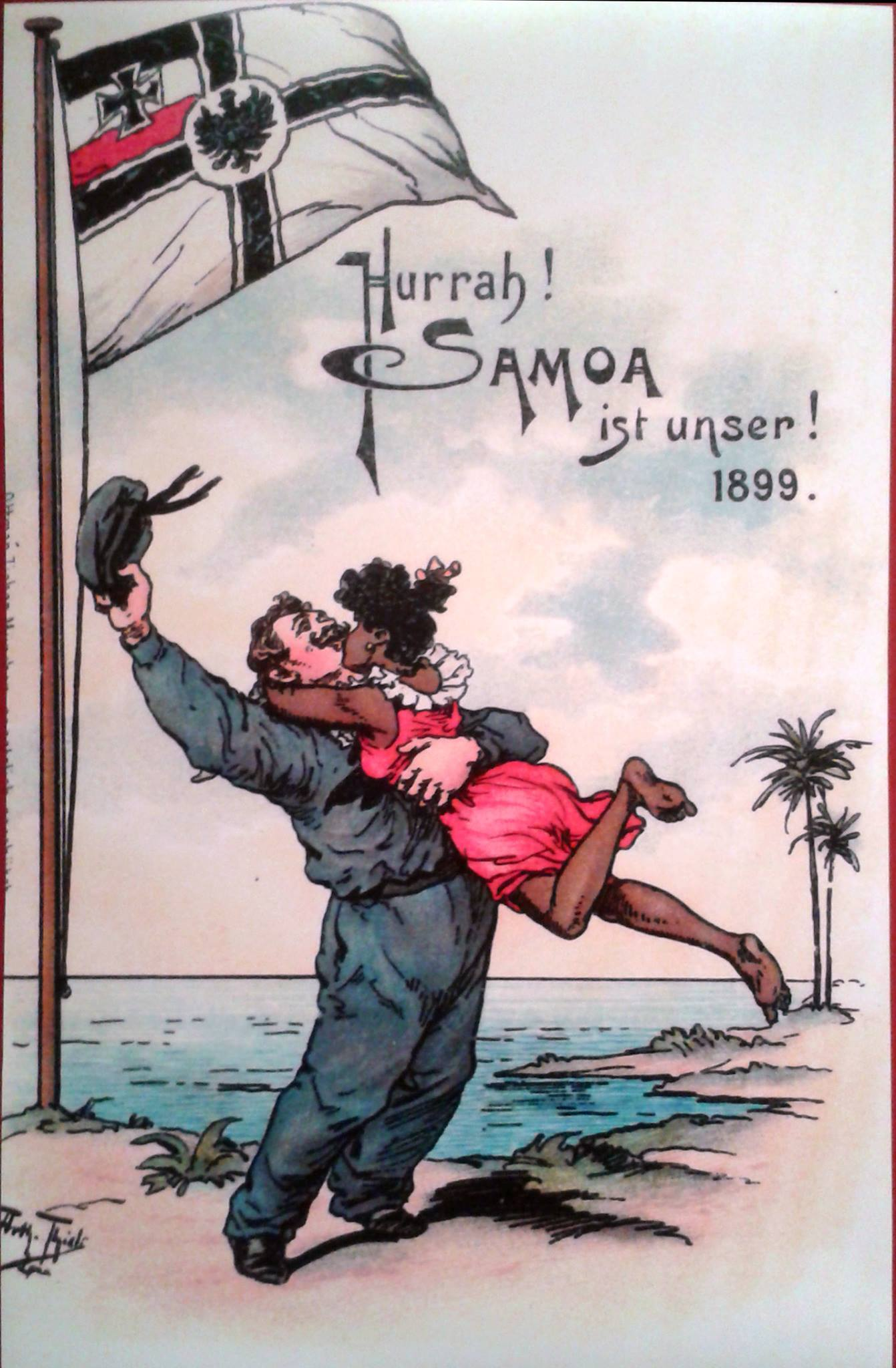
Imperial German propaganda celebrating the colonization of Samoa in 1899

Germany–Samoa relations began in the mid-nineteenth century in the time of Imperial Germany. Hanseatic trading companies established relations with Samoa, and the German Reich signed a trade agreement with Samoa in 1879. A deterioration in the relationship between German officials and Samoan king Malietoa Laupepa led to the former exiling the latter from Samoa in 1887. This resulted in the Samoan Civil War, in which a naval standoff among Germany, the United States, and the British Empire occurred. The war officially ended in 1889 with the Treaty of Berlin, but hostilities remained until 1894.

Laupepa died in 1898, and Germany conflicted with the United States and the British Empire for imperial control of Samoa in the Second Samoan Civil War, which concluded with the Tripartite Convention in 1899. This convention divided Samoa into German Samoa and American Samoa. Germany lost control of German Samoa in 1914 after it was invaded by the Samoa Expeditionary Force and occupied by New Zealand at the beginning of World War I.

=== Nazi Germany ===
In the 1930s, German nationalist sentiment still existed in the Territory of Western Samoa, administered by New Zealand. The Nazi Party, led by Adolf Hitler, came to power in Germany in 1933, and in January 1934 a German colonist in Samoa named Alfred Matthes received permission to establish a Samoan branch of the party. The Reichsmarine cruiser Karlsruhe visited Western Samoa a month later, boosting German nationalism in the territory. The Samoan branch of the Nazi Party was disbanded in April 1939.

=== Post-WWII ===
West Germany established diplomatic relations with Samoa in 1972, and East Germany followed suit in 1988. Modern Germany seeks to help Samoa fight against climate change, and Samoa is a member of the United Nations Group of Friends on Climate and Security, which was founded by Germany and Nauru. Germany provides consultation to Samoa on the regional level, consulting on the transformation of Samoa's energy sector.

During the COVID-19 pandemic in Samoa, Germany collaborated with Samoan municipal governments to educate children about hygienic practices and to improve sanitary facilities. Germany also collaborated with the Samoan National Archives and Records Authority to help digitize and preserve historical materials.

== Economic relations ==
Germany and Samoa have modest bilateral trade relations. In 2023, Germany exported €515,000 worth of goods to Samoa and imported €239,000 worth of goods from the country. From 2014 to 2020, Germany supported Samoa economically through the European Development Fund.
