= Keighley News =

British weekly newspaper

- Type: Weekly newspaper
- Format: Compact (Tabloid)
- Owner(s): Newsquest
- Editor: Nigel Burton
- Founded: 1862
- Language: English
- Headquarters: Keighley, England
- Circulation: 2,535 (as of 2023)
- ISSN: 0961-1924
- Website: keighleynews.co.uk

The Keighley News is a weekly newspaper based in Keighley, West Yorkshire, England. As well as Keighley, its circulation area includes Cross Hills, Cullingworth, Denholme, East Morton, Haworth, Oxenhope, Silsden and Steeton.

The newspaper was a broadsheet until March 2007 when it became a tabloid. The same year it also changed its publication day from Friday to Thursday. It is the sister paper of Telegraph & Argus.

The Keighley News is owned by Newsquest, the second largest publisher of regional newspapers in the United Kingdom. Its circulation figure for the period from January to December 2018, according to the Audit Bureau of Circulation, was 5,419.

From September 2007 to July 2012 half of the Keighley News building was leased to Bradford College who operated a community learning centre from the premises. The Keighley News reception desk closed its doors permanently on 29 January 2013 with all reception services and editing now being carried out at the Telegraph & Argus offices in Bradford. The whole building at Keighley has been sold off to a local businessman. The Keighley News staff now work from Newsquest's office in Skipton.

== First World War ==
On 21 November 1914, the Keighley News publicised a letter which was received by William Morley, from his son, the explorer, Herbert Morley. The letter was dated 27 July 1914, (one day before the First World War broke out and about a month before the Occupation of German Samoa operation), therein Herbert tells of six German warships docking in Samoa; "probably… just a bit of a show-off".
