= Herbert Morley (explorer) =

Victorian explorer

Herbert Morley was a Victorian explorer. He is featured at the Bradford Museums & Galleries through a collection of items relating to Morley, and as an "inspirer" for junior wannabe explorers.

Herbert Morley lived, as young boy, on Devonshire Street in Keighley, West Yorkshire, England. His father was William Morley.

In 1914, Herbert Morley was in business in Samoa, then a German colony (German Samoa), which was later captured by the RNZDF.

On 27 July 1914, one day before World War I broke out (and about a month before the Occupation of German Samoa operation), Herbert wrote a letter to his father, therein he tells of six German warships docking in Samoa; "probably… just a bit of a show-off."

He travelled globally and has been sending treasures back to Keighley and postcards to his family.

Morley ended up in Fiji.

== See also ==
- Bradford, Museums and art galleries
- Occupation of German Samoa
