= Erich Schultz-Ewerth =

German ethnologist (1870-1935)

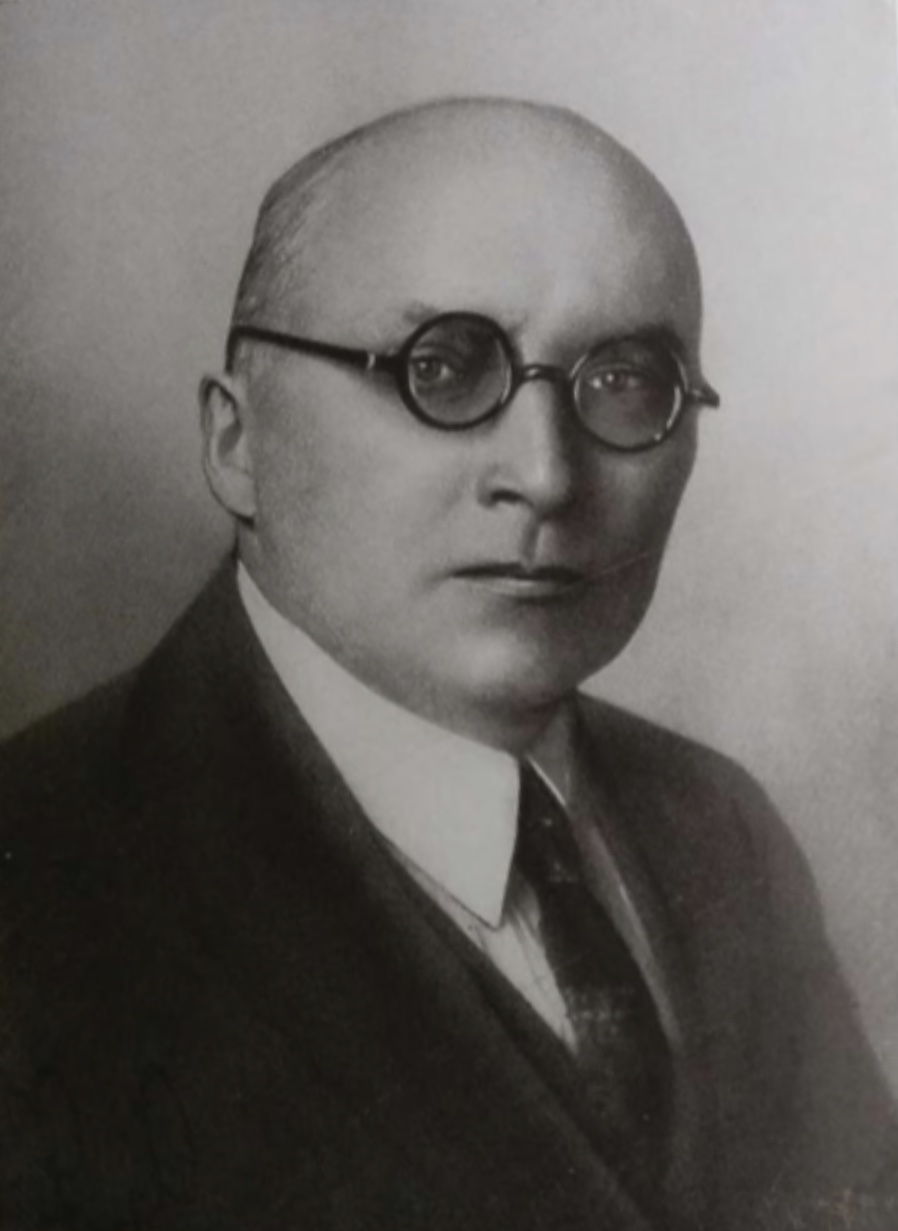

Governor of German Samoa
- In office 19 December 1911 – 29 August 1914
- Monarch: Wilhelm II
- Preceded by: Wilhelm Solf
- Succeeded by: Robert Logan

Personal details
- Born: Erich Bernhard Theodor Schultz-Ewerth; 8 March 1870 Berlin, Kingdom of Prussia
- Died: 25 June 1935 (aged 65) Berlin, Nazi Germany
- Spouse: Charlott Schultz-Ewerth (divorced)
- Children: 1
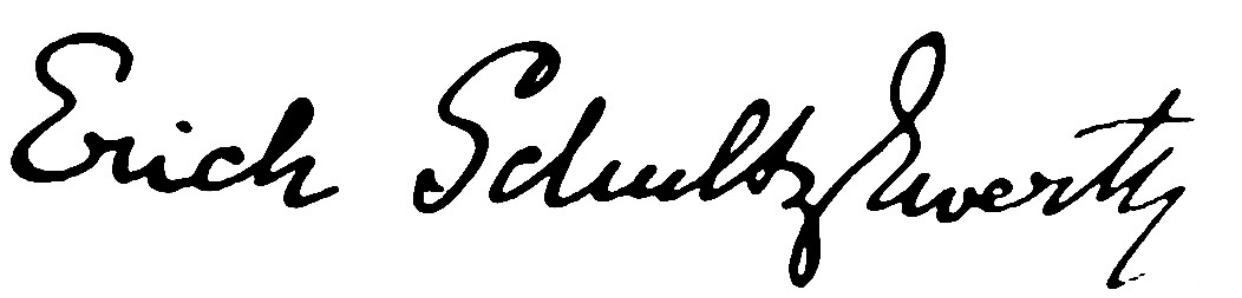
- Signature

Erich Bernhard Theodor Schultz-Ewerth (8 March 1870 – 25 June 1935) was a German jurist, ethnologist, and colonial administrator who served as the 2nd Governor of German Samoa. Prior to his tenure as governor he was Native Secretary, Chief Judge, and Deputy Governor under Governor Wilhelm Solf.

== Early life ==
Upon returning to Germany from Samoa Schultz changed his last name to Schultz-Ewerth. During Schultz-Ewerth studies in 1888 he became a member of the Burschenschaft Thuringia Charlottenburg / Berlin.

Erich Schultz-Ewerth entered the judicial service of the Kingdom of Prussia in 1892 and passed the major state examination in 1897. After joining the Colonial Department of the Foreign Office in 1898, he traveled to German East Africa at the end of the year, where he served as a district judge. In 1899 he had to travel back to Germany due to illness. After a brief return to the judiciary, he was transferred at his own request back to the Colonial Department on 22 December 1899, and was appointed as a district judge to German Samoa in 1901, and eventually appointed the Imperial Chief Judge in 1910.

=== Samoa ===
Starting in 1902, Schultz-Ewerth served as Native Secretary, Chief Judge, and then Deputy Governor under Governor Wilhelm Solf. In 1912, Schultz-Ewerth was appointed as the Governor of German Samoa.

Oral traditions in Samoa and European studies of Samoa, such as that by Newton Rowe in 1930, claim that Schultz-Ewerth received a malofie tattoo during his time as governor. Schultz-Ewerth never wrote about having this tattoo nor were any photographs or sketches ever made of it. Schultz-Ewerth accepted the name Sulusi and adopted Fatu Aiono Frost, a Samoan.

When Mataʻafa Iosefo died on 6 February 1912, the title of Ali'i Sili was abolished by Schultz-Ewerth. The position was formally abolished on 12 June 1913, but Schultz-Ewerth placated the Samoans by creating two new positions that would advise the governor.

Solf, now Secretary for the Colonies, ordered Schultz-Ewerth on 17 January 1912, to prohibit marriages between natives and non-natives. Schultz-Ewerth defended mixed-marriages against this pressure. He wrote in his memoirs that Solf was wrong for rejecting mixed-marriages in Samoa. Heinrich Schnee and Schultz-Ewerth questioned the Nazi racial laws in 1933, by asking if Germans descended from Polynesias were Aryan or not. The Nazi government responded that it would be determined on an individual basis as the "origin of the Polynesian race has not been completely scientifically clarified".

New Zealand's occupation of German Samoa ended Schultz-Ewerth's tenure as governor.

== Later life ==
When Schultz-Ewerth returned to Germany he gave his children the honorific Samoan names of Aiono, Fuatino, and Tuala while Frost did the inverse with his own son, who he named Schultz Leofo Frost. In 1924, twenty Samoans came to Berlin and conferred chiefly status to Schultz-Ewerth's children.

== Personal life ==
Schultz-Ewerth was married to the writer Charlott Schultz-Ewerth and their marriage ended in divorce.

== Works cited ==
=== Books ===
- Hempenstall, Peter (1978). Pacific Islanders under German Rule: a study in the meaning of colonial resistance. ANU Press. ISBN 0708113508.
- Hempenstall, Peter; Rutherford, Noel (1984). Protest and Dissent in the Colonial Pacific. University of the South Pacific.
- Meleisea, Malama (1987). The Making of Modern Samoa: Traditional Authority and Colonial Administration in the History of Western Samoa. Suva, Fiji: University of the South Pacific Press. ISBN 9789820200319
- Wildenthal, Lora (2001). German Women for Empire, 1884-1945. Duke University Press. ISBN 9780822380955.

=== Journals ===
- Fitzpatrick, Matthew (2017). "Embodying Empire: European Tattooing and German Colonial Power". Past & Present (234). Oxford University Press: 101–135. doi:10.2307/45215238. JSTOR 45215238.
- Steinmetz, George (2004). "The uncontrollable afterlives of ethnography: Lessons from 'salvage colonialism' in the German overseas empire". Ethnography. 5 (3). Sage Publishing: 251–288. doi:10.2307/24047875. JSTOR 24047875.

Government offices
Preceded by Wilhelm Solf	Governor of German Samoa; 1911–1914	Succeeded by Robert Logan as Military Administrator
