= Telefunken Railroad (Samoa) =

Coordinates: 13.883532°S 171.831812°W

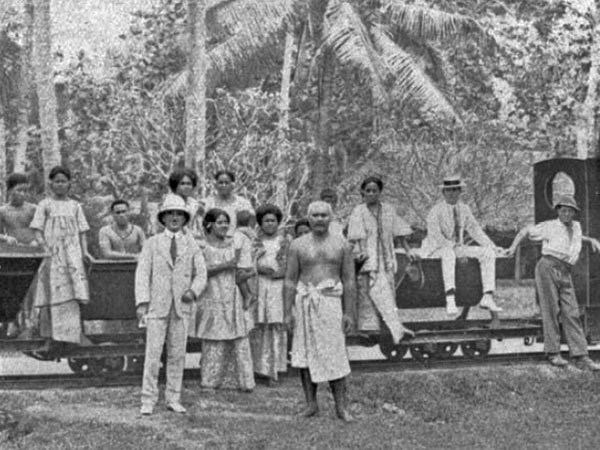
- Tamasese, the indigenous king of Samoa, inspects the railroad

Technical
- Line length: 8 miles (12.9 km)
- Track gauge: Probably 2 ft (610 mm)

The Telefunken Railroad (German: Telefunkeneisenbahn) narrow gauge railway was constructed in 1914 and connected the waterfront at Apia and a wireless station on Mount Vaea in German Samoa.

== History ==
In 1914, the Germans began construction of a light railway on Upolu, the main island of German Samoa, to transport building material from the waterfront at Apia to the wireless station. The railway was inaugurated on 1 August 1914, just as World War I began. The railway was approximately 4 miles (6.4 km) long, or 8 miles (12.9 km) including the various branches to the coconut plantations. A petrol locomotive engine, which had probably been manufactured by Motorenfabrik Oberursel for the Telefunken Wireless Co., was capable of hauling a maximum load of five tons at a top speed of 12 miles per hour (19 km/h).

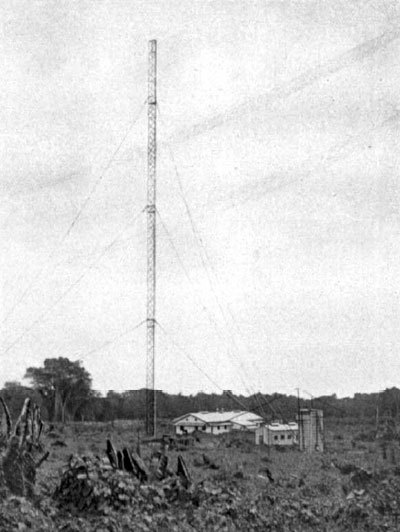
Telefunken station near Apia after its completion on 1 August 1914, tower height: 120 m, antenna energy: 35 kW

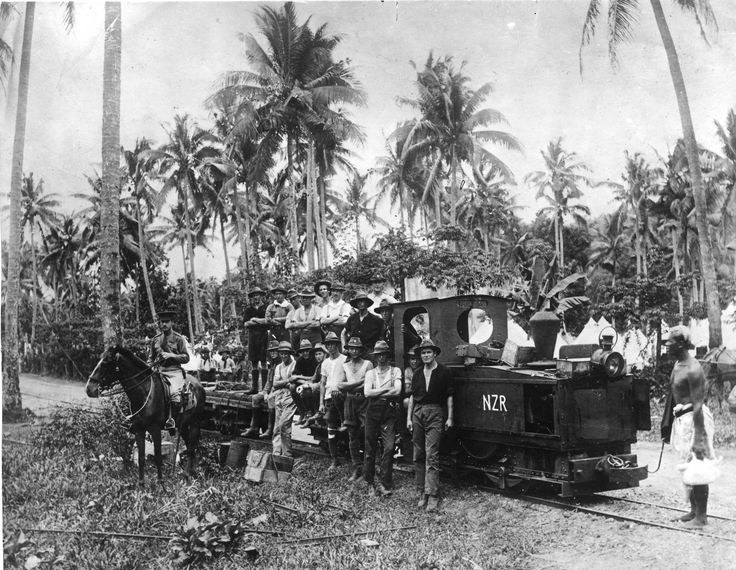
New Zealand Railway engineers of the 3rd Auckland Regiment in Samoa alongside the commandeered German narrow-gauge locomotive, formerly used by the Germans for the construction of the wireless station, now bearing the letters 'NZR'

German Samoa was occupied on 30 August 1914 by an expeditionary force sent from New Zealand. When the New Zealand Railway engineers unit of the 3rd Auckland Regiment arrived in Samoa, the line was in disrepair, but a gang of surfacemen, under Lieutenant Christophers, lifted, ballasted and relaid the rails. A frequent service was instituted, and for several days the ‘train’ averaged 30 trips per day between Apia and to Vaea Camp, where the Railway Corps was encamped. The engine was quickly rebranded N.Z.R. and christened A1, but the men missed the omission of the customary whistle of an ‘A’ class engine. Two enginemen were thus requested to arrange to have a whistle affixed to the engine.

It was difficult to re-commission the wireless station because essential parts had been removed by the Germans. The petroleum engine of the Apia master butcher's ice cream machine was confiscated and attempts made to use it to power the station. It turned out to be far too weak. After reinstalling the regulator parts that the Germans had removed, the original glow-head diesel engine started suddenly, but since the regulator had not been set accurately, it ran at much too high revolutions and the flywheel exploded. A part of the flywheel broke through the roof, reached the tower at a height of 75 m, bent it, fell down and amputated the leg of a station worker. The repair of the station had become a matter of prestige for the English, New Zealand and Australian forces. Despite being discreet, the failed attempts to repair the station had not gone unnoticed by Samoans and the reputation of the occupying forces suffered.

The New Zealand railwaymen built additional track to the camps established at Vaea and Malifa. During the occupation, the railway was used for hauling ammunition, ballast and camp material, including timber for the tents and shingle for the roads in the new camps, and at the wireless station. The ‘Apia Express’ was also used by the troops for regular outings on a Sunday when they were on leave.
