= German Samoa =

German colony in Oceania (1900–1920)

Coordinates: 13.8000°S 172.1000°W

German Samoa Königreich Samoa (German) Malo Kaisalika (Samoan)
- 1900–1914
- Service flag of the colonial office Coat of arms of the German Empire
- Anthem: "Heil dir im Siegerkranz" (German) (English: "'Hail to Thee in the Victor's Crown")
- Brown: German New Guinea; yellow: German Pacific protectorates; red: German Samoa; orange: North Solomons, ceded to Britain
- Status: Protectorate of Germany
- Capital: Apia
- Common languages: German (official, administration) Samoan (native)
- Government
- Tupu Sili (ruler of Samoa)
  - 1900–1914: Wilhelm II
- Governor
  - 1900–1911: Wilhelm Solf
  - 1911–1914: Erich Schultz-Ewerth
- Historical era: German colonization in the Pacific Ocean
  - Tripartite Convention: 2 December 1899
  - Colonization: 1 March 1900
  - NZ occupation: 30 August 1914
  - Treaty of Versailles: 10 January 1920
  - League mandate: 17 December 1920

Area
- 1912: 2,831 km^{2} (1,093 sq mi)

Population
  - 1912: 33,500
- Currency: Goldmark
Preceded by	Succeeded by
Kingdom of Samoa	Western Samoa Trust Territory

German Samoa, officially the Kingdom of Samoa (German: Königreich Samoa; Samoan: Malo Kaisalika), was a German protectorate from 1900 to 1920, consisting of the islands of Upolu, Savaiʻi, Apolima and Manono, now wholly within the Independent State of Samoa, formerly Western Samoa. Samoa was the last German colonial acquisition in the Pacific Ocean, received following the Tripartite Convention signed at Washington on 2 December 1899 with ratifications exchanged on 16 February 1900. It was the only German colony in the Pacific, aside from the Kiautschou Bay Leased Territory in China, that was administered separately from German New Guinea.

== Expansion of German influence ==
In 1855, J. C. Godeffroy & Sohn expanded its trading business into the Pacific following negotiations by August Unshelm, Godeffroy's agent in Valparaíso. He sailed out to the Samoan Islands, which were then known as the Navigator Islands. During the second half of the 19th century, German influence in Samoa expanded with large scale plantation operations being introduced for coconut, cacao and hevea rubber cultivation, especially on the island of 'Upolu where German firms monopolised copra and cocoa bean processing.

The trading operations of J. C. Godeffroy & Sohn extended to islands in the Central Pacific. In 1865, a trading captain acting on behalf of J. C. Godeffroy & Sohn obtained a 25-year lease to the eastern islet of Niuoku of Nukulaelae Atoll. J. C. Godeffroy und Sohn was taken over in 1879 by Handels-und Plantagen-Gesellschaft der Südsee-Inseln zu Hamburg (DHPG). Competition in the trading operations in the Central Pacific came from Ruge, Hedemann & Co, established in 1875, which was succeeded by H. M. Ruge and Company until that firm failed in about 1887.

Tensions caused in part by the conflicting interests of the German traders and plantation owners and British business enterprises and American business interests led to the first Samoan Civil War. The war was fought roughly between 1886 and 1894, primarily between Samoans though the German military intervened on several occasions. The United States and the United Kingdom opposed the German activity which led to a confrontation in Apia Harbour in 1887.

In 1899 after the Second Samoan Civil War, the Samoan Islands were divided by the three involved powers. The Samoa Tripartite Convention gave control of the islands west of 171 degrees west longitude to Germany, the eastern islands to the United States (present-day American Samoa) and the United Kingdom was compensated with other territories in the Pacific and West Africa.

== Economic development ==
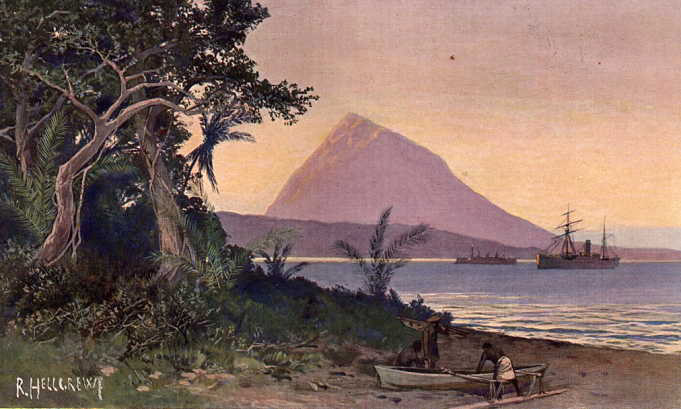
Saluafata harbour (R. Hellgrewe, 1908), 10 miles east of Apia

During the colonial years new companies were formed to greatly expand agricultural activities which in turn increased tax revenues for public works that further stimulated economic growth; "...over all, the period of German rule was the most progressive, economically, that the country has experienced." The major commodity of the island was copra, an industry that was developed on the island mainly by the DHPG (Deutsche Handels und Plantagengesellschaft) and other planters. The DHPG's successor, J. C. Godeffroy, as the leading trading and plantation company on Samoa, maintained communications among its various subdivisions and branches and the home base at Hamburg with its own fleet of ships. Since the Samoan cultural envelope did not include "labor for hire," the importation of Chinese (coolie) laborers (and to a lesser extent Melanesians from New Guinea working for DHPG) was implemented, and "...by 1914 over 2,000 Chinese were in the colony, providing an effective labor force for the [German] plantations."

Major plantation enterprises on Samoa:

- J. C. Godeffroy & Son (superseded as DHPG)
- Deutsche Samoa Gesellschaft
- Safata-Samoa-Gesellschaft
- Samoa Kautschuk Kompagnie

== History ==
=== Colonial administration ===
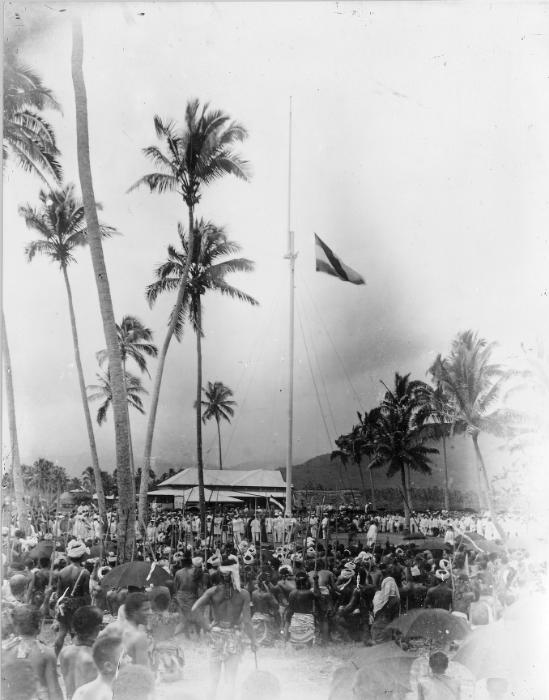
Raising the German flag at Mulinuʻu, 1900 (photo by Alfred James Tattersall)

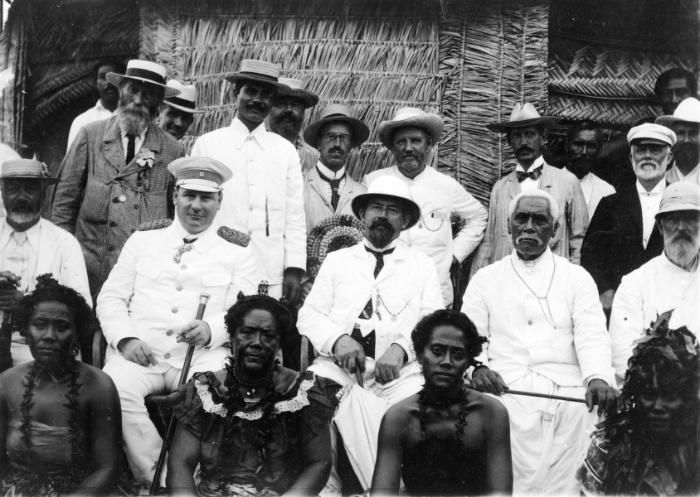
Group with Governor Wilhelm Solf (wearing peaked cap), New Zealand parliamentarian Charles H. Mills and paramount chief Mata'afa Iosefo during a visit by Mills to German Samoa, 1903

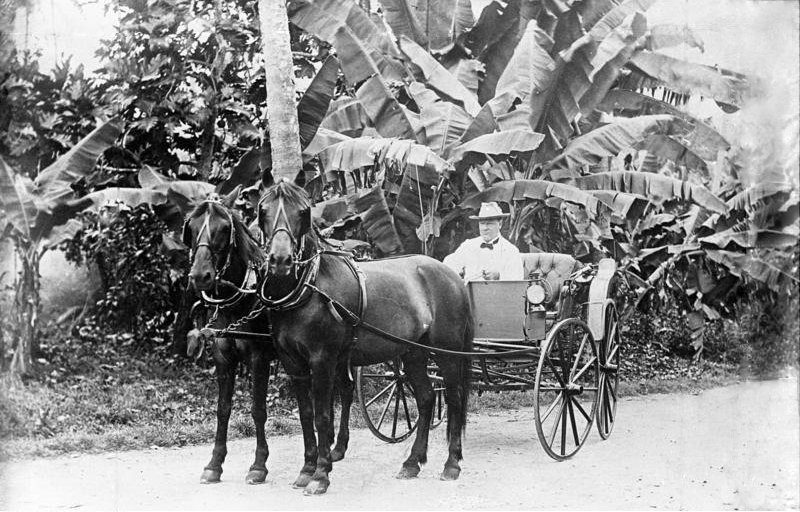
Governor Wilhelm Solf at Apia in 1910

The German colonial period lasted for 14 years and officially began with the raising of the imperial flag on 1 March 1900. Wilhelm Solf became the first governor. In its political relations with the Samoan people, Solf's government showed similar qualities of intelligence and care as in the economic arena. He skillfully grafted Samoan institutions into the new system of colonial government by the acceptance of native customs. Solf himself learned many of the customs and rituals important to the Samoan people, observing cultural etiquette including the ceremonial drinking of kava.

Solf co-opted Samoan chieftains, bestowing empty dignities on them.

Solf restricted cricket-playing, banned gambling, banned land transactions, and banned interracial marriage.

"German rule brought peace and order for the first time. ... Authority, in the person of the governor, became paternal, fair, and absolute. Berlin was far away; there was no cable or radio." The German administrators inherited a system by which some two hundred leading Samoans held various public offices. Over the years, rivalries for these positions, as well as appointments by colonial officials created tensions that dissident matai (chiefs) gathered together into a militant movement to eventually march armed on Apia in 1909. Governor Solf met the Samoans, his resolute personality persuaded them to return home. However, political agitation continued to simmer, several warships arrived and Solf's patience came to an end. He had ten of the leaders, including their wives, children and retainers, in all 72 souls, deported to Saipan in the German Mariana Islands, in effect terminating the revolt.

Energetic efforts by colonial administrators established the first public school system; a hospital was built and staffed and enlarged as needed. Of all colonial possessions of the European powers in the Pacific, German Samoa was by far the best-roaded; all roads up until 1942 had been constructed under German direction. The imperial grants from the Berlin treasury which had marked the first eight years of German rule were no longer needed after 1908. Samoa had become a self-supporting colony. Wilhelm Solf left Samoa in 1910 to be appointed Colonial Secretary at Berlin; he was succeeded as governor by Erich Schultz, the former chief justice in the protectorate. The Germans built the Telefunken Railroad from Apia onto the Mount Vaea for transporting building materials for the 120 m high mast of their Telefunken wireless station, which was inaugurated as planned on 1 August 1914, just a few days after the beginning of World War I.

The German colonial administrator used the former home of writer Robert Louis Stevenson as a residence; the building is now the Robert Louis Stevenson Museum.

Germany did not experience similar levels of violent anti-colonial resistance in Samoa as it did in Southwest Africa, Cameroon, or East Africa. However, there were anti-colonial resistance movements in Samoa, such as the elite-led Oloa and Mau a Pule movements, and youth movements against German colonial rule.

=== Occupation ===
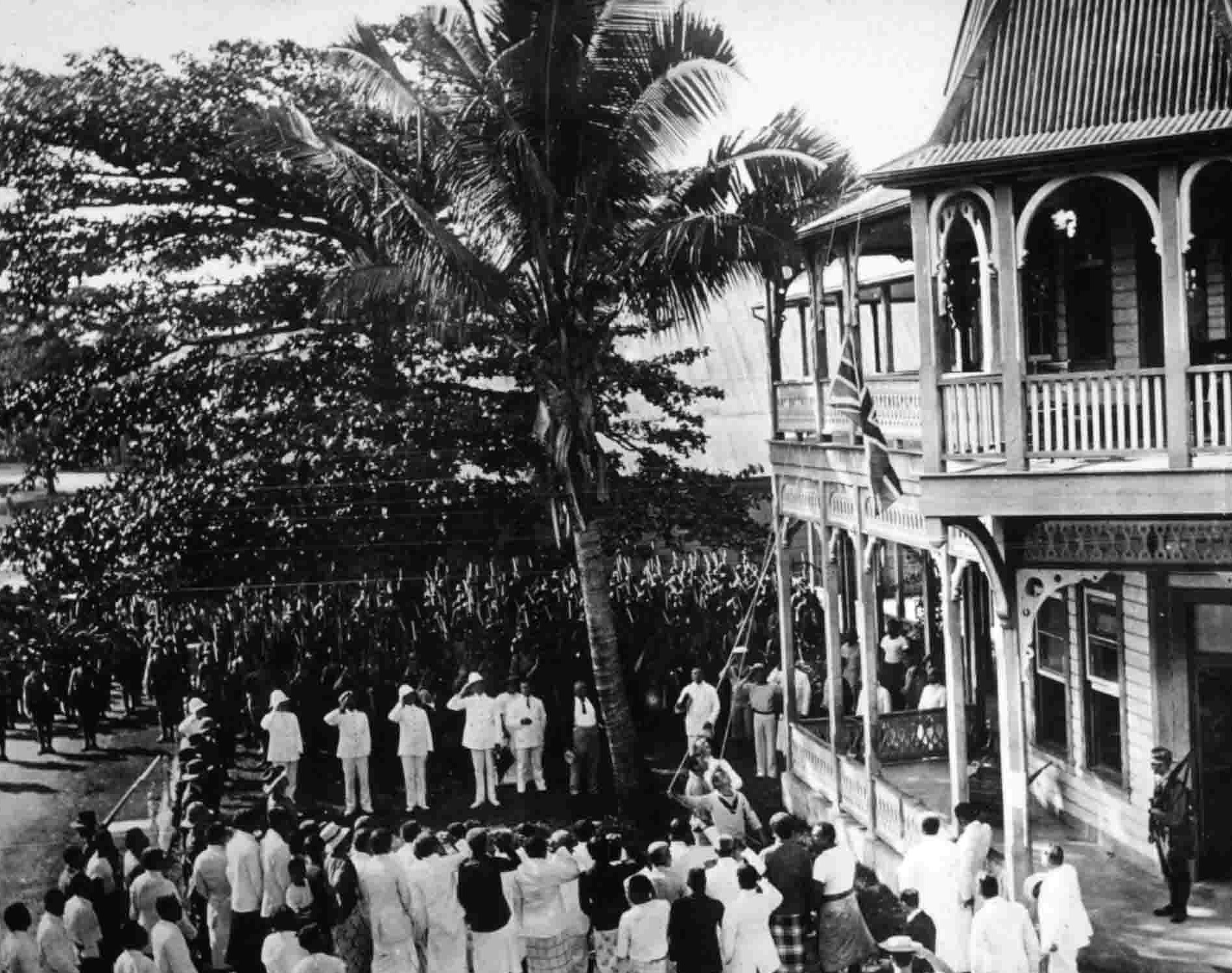
The Union Jack being hoisted at a building in Apia, 30 August 1914

Other than native Samoan police, Germany had no armed forces stationed in the islands. The small gunboat SMS Geier and the unarmed survey ship Planet were assigned to the so-called "Australian Station" (encompassing all German South Seas protectorates, not the British dominion Australia), but Geier never reached Samoa.

British-born Herbert Morley, who was in business in Samoa in 1914, sent a letter dated 27 July 1914, where he tells of six German warships docking off Samoa. The letter was publicized in the Keighley News on 17 November 1914.

At the behest of the United Kingdom the colony was invaded unopposed on the morning of 29 August 1914 by troops of the Samoa Expeditionary Force. Vice Admiral Count Maximilian von Spee of the East Asia Squadron gained knowledge of the occupation and hastened to Samoa with the armored cruisers SMS Scharnhorst and SMS Gneisenau, arriving off Apia on 14 September 1914. He determined however that a landing would only be of temporary advantage in an Allied dominated sea and the cruisers departed. New Zealand occupied the German colony through to 1920, then governed the islands until independence in 1962 as a League of Nations Class C Mandate at first and then as a United Nations Trust Territory after 1946.

== Planned symbols for German Samoa ==
In 1914, a series of drafts were made for proposed coats of arms and flags for the German colonies, including German Samoa. However, World War I broke out before the designs were finished, and the symbols were never used. Following its defeat in the war, Germany lost all its colonies, so the coats of arms and flags became unnecessary.

Proposed flag

Proposed coat of arms

== See also ==
- Germany–Samoa relations
- History of Samoa
- List of colonial governors of Samoa
- Falemata'aga - Museum of Samoa

== Bibliography ==
- Davidson, J. W. (1967). Samoa mo Samoa: the emergence of the independent state of Western Samoa. Melbourne: Oxford University Press. hdl:2027/heb03584.0001.001. ISBN 978-0-19-550060-8. LCCN 68079458. OCLC 458233.
- Kolonialgesellschaft, Deutsche (1898). Kleiner deutscher Kolonialatlas (in German). Berlin: Dietrich Reimer. OCLC 37420819.
- Gerlach, Hans-Henning; Birken, Andreas (2001). Deutsche Kolonien und deutsche Kolonialpolitik. Vol. 4: Südsee und die deutsche Seepost: Atlas, Handbuch, Katalog der postalischen Entwertungen. Königsbronn: Philathek-Verlag. ISBN 978-3-931753-26-9. OCLC 49909546.
- Graudenz, Karlheinz; Schindler, Hanns Michael (1995). Die deutschen Kolonien: Geschichte der deutschen Schutzgebiete in Wort, Bild und Karte (7th ed.). Augsburg: Weltbild Verlag. ISBN 978-3-89350-701-6. OCLC 35565218.
- Lewthwaite, Gordon R. (1962). "Life, Land and Agriculture to Mid-Century". In Cumberland, Kenneth B.; Fox, James W. (eds.). Western Samoa: land, life and agriculture in tropical Polynesia. Christchurch, N.Z.: Whitcombe & Tombs. LCCN 64003687. OCLC 512636.
- McKay, Cyril Gilbert Reeves (1968). Samoana, A Personal Story of the Samoan Islands. Wellington, N.Z.: Reed Publishing. LCCN 77409684. OCLC 32790.
- Schultz-Naumann, Joachim (1985). Unter Kaisers Flagge: Deutschlands Schutzgebiete im Pazifik und in China einst und heute [Under the Kaiser's Flag, Germany's Protectorates in the Pacific and in China then and today] (in German). München: Universitas. ISBN 978-3-8004-1094-1. OCLC 14130501.
- Ryden, George Herbert (1975) [1928]. The foreign policy of the United States in relation to Samoa. New York: Octagon Books. LCCN 75017708. OCLC 1502379. OL 5195808M.
- Spoehr, Florence Mann (1963). White Falcon, The House of J.C. Godeffroy and its Commercial and Scientific Role in the Pacific. Palo Alto, Calif.: Pacific Books. LCCN 63018693. OCLC 3149438.
- Washausen, Helmut (1968). Hamburg und die Kolonialpolitik des Deutschen Reiches [Hamburg and Colonial Politics of the German Empire] (in German). Hamburg: Hans Christians Verlag. LCCN 73410422. OCLC 250090.
