= List of pro-Axis leaders and governments or direct control in occupied territories =

This is a list of Native Pro-Axis Leaders and Governments or Direct Control in Occupied Territories, including:

1. territories with some indigenous pro-Axis leaders
2. collaborating local administrations
3. direct administration by occupying pro-Axis forces

== List ==
- Albania (until 1945) (Note: Italian protectorate till 1943 and German occupation after 1943)
- Bohemia and Moravia (until 1945)
- Carpatho-Ruthenia (until 1944)
- Belgium (until 1944)
- Banat (until 1944)
- Bačka (until 1944)
- Bosnia (until 1944-45)
- Herzegovina (until 1944-45)
- Dalmatia (until 1945)
- Slovenia (Carniola) (until 1945)
- Littoral (Küstenland) (until 1945)
- Sanjak of Novi Pazar (until 1944)
- Transylvania (Siebenburgen) (until 1944)
- Kosovo (until 1944)
- Macedonia (until 1944)
- Montenegro (until 1944) (Note: Italian governorate of Montenegro till 1943 and German-occupied territory of Montenegro after 1943)
- Serbia (until 1944)
- Croatia (until 1945)
- Slavonia (until 1944)
- Galicia (until 1944)
- Dobruja (until 1944)
- Bukovina (until 1944)
- Bessarabia (until 1944)
- Transnistria (until 1944)
- Moldavia (until 1944)
- Netherlands (until 1944)
- Luxembourg (until 1944)
- France (until 1944) (Note: German held and Italian held area of France in addition to the puppet regime)
- Channel Islands (German held area of British Isles) (until 1945)
- Greece (until 1944)
- Denmark (until 1945)
- Dodecanese (until 1943) (Note: Italian Islands of the Aegean until 1943 and then German occupation)
- Norway (until 1945)
- Estonia (until 1944)
- Latvia (until 1944)
- Lithuania (until 1944)
- Ukraine (until 1944)
- Belarus (until 1944)
- Russia (Occupied areas) (until 1944)
- Lokot (until 1944)
- Caucasia (north areas) (until 1943)
- Chechnya-Ingushetia (until 1944)
- General Government (German administration over occupied Polish areas) (until 1945)
- Syria (until 1941)
- Lebanon (until 1941)
- Morocco (until 1943)
- Algeria (until 1943)
- Tunisia (until 1943)
- Libya (until 1943)
- Ethiopia (until 1941)
- Somalia (until 1941)
- Eritrea (until 1941)
- Djibouti (until 1942)
- Madagascar (until 1942)
- Hong Kong (Kowloon) (Japanese held British Land) (until 1945)
- Philippines (until 1945)
- Cambodia (until 1945)
- Vietnam (until 1945)
- Burma (until 1945)
- Malaya (Malacca) (until 1945)
- Singapore (Syonan) (until 1945)
- Brunei (until 1945)
- Dutch East Indies (Indonesia)(until 1945)
- Christmas Island (Japanese Held British Land) (until 1945)
- East Timor (Japanese Held Portuguese Land) (until 1945)
- New Guinea (Japanese Held Australian Land) (until 1945)
- Andaman & Nicobar Islands (Japanese Held British Land) (until 1945)
- Attu (Japanese Held American Land) (until 1943)
- Kiska (Japanese Held American Land) (until 1943)
- Solomon Islands (until 1943)
- Gilbert Islands (until 1944)
- Guam (until 1944)
- Wake Island (until 1945)
- Nauru (until 1945)

== See also ==
- Military occupation
- Quisling
- Collaboration
