= Occupation of German Samoa =

World War I occupation by New Zealand

- Part of the Asian and Pacific theatre of World War I
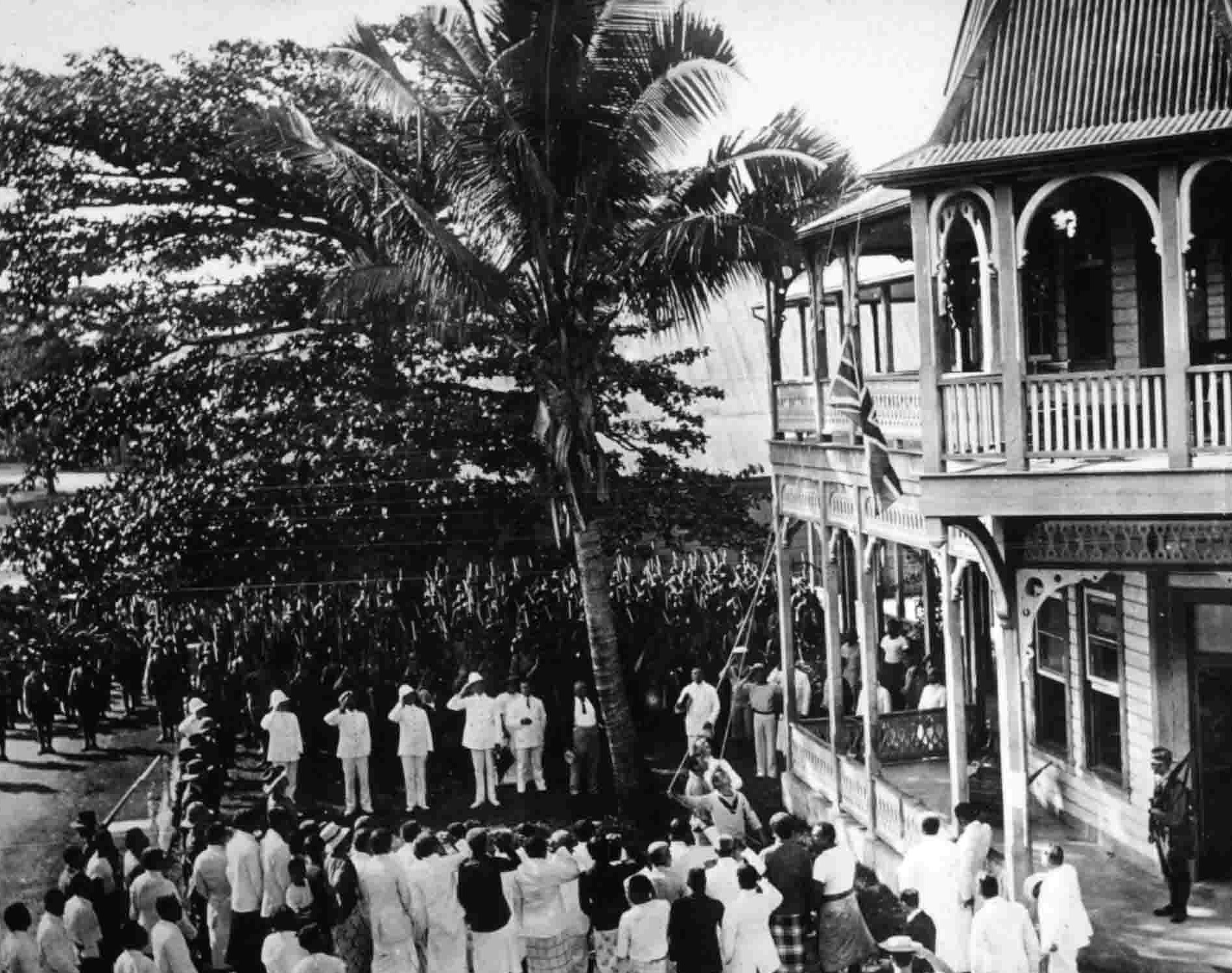
- The Union Flag being raised at the courthouse at Apia on 30 August 1914
Date	29–30 August 1914
Location	German Samoa
Result	Allied victory

Belligerents
New Zealand; Naval Support: Australia; France	Germany; German Samoa

Commanders and leaders
(Dominion of New Zealand) Robert Logan	(German Samoa) Erich Schultz-Ewerth

Strength
1,413 (landing party); 6 cruisers	100 (militia / Fita-Fita)

The Occupation of Samoa was the takeover – and subsequent administration – of the Pacific colony of German Samoa by New Zealand during World War I. It started in late August 1914 with landings by the Samoa Expeditionary Force from New Zealand. The landings were unopposed and the New Zealanders took possession of Samoa for the New Zealand Government on behalf of King George V. The Samoa Expeditionary Force remained in the country until 1915, while its commander, Colonel Robert Logan, continued to administer Samoa on behalf of the New Zealand Government until 1919. The takeover of Samoa was New Zealand's first military action in World War I.

== Background ==
Upon the outbreak of World War I on 5 August, the New Zealand Government authorised the raising of the New Zealand Expeditionary Force (NZEF) for service in the war. Mobilisation for the war had already begun, with preparations discreetly beginning a few days prior. The day after the declaration of war, the British Government requested New Zealand seize the wireless station at German Samoa, a protectorate of the German Empire, deeming it "a great and urgent Imperial service."

Since the days of Richard Seddon, the Prime Minister of New Zealand from 1893 to 1906, the New Zealand Government had aspired to control Samoa. Even prior to the war, plans for the occupation of Samoa had been laid down by the Commandant of the New Zealand Military Forces, Major General Alexander Godley, who believed that this would be one likely usage of New Zealand's military in the event of an outbreak of hostilities. The British request was immediately accepted and instructions issued to Godley to raise a composite force specifically tasked for this purpose.

== Prelude ==
What was to be known as the Samoa Expeditionary Force (SEF) was formed with volunteers drawn primarily from the Auckland and Wellington Military Districts. It included an infantry component, with three companies of infantry from the 3rd (Auckland) and 5th (Wellington) Regiments, a battery of field guns, a section of engineers, companies of railway engineers and signallers, as well as personnel from the Royal Naval Reserve, Army Service Corps, a Field Ambulance section, as well as nurses and chaplains. There was also a detail from the New Zealand Post & Telegraph Company.

Colonel Robert Logan, a member of the New Zealand Staff Corps and commander of the Auckland Military District, was appointed to command of the SEF. At the time of its first formal parade on 11 August 1914, the SEF consisted of over 1,400 personnel.

The SEF departed New Zealand on 15 August in a convoy of troopships escorted by the New Zealand Naval Forces' HMS Philomel along with the Australian Navy's HMAS Pyramus and HMAS Psyche. The escorting cruisers, all "P" class ships, were third-rate vessels deemed to be obsolete and no match for Vizeadmiral (Vice Admiral) Maximilian von Spee's East Asia Squadron with its armoured cruisers SMS Scharnhorst and SMS Gneisenau. (Note: There were concerns about the risk that the German squadron posed to the convoy, but McGibbon denies any basis for the assertion in the 1923 history, subsequently repeated by Michael King in his 2003 history of New Zealand, that the force narrowly escaped disaster, with the German cruisers sailing well to the north at the time rather than only 15 miles (25 km) distant.) Therefore, it was arranged that the convoy would liaise at Fiji with the modern battlecruiser HMAS Australia and the French cruiser Montcalm. However, the day after departing New Zealand and unbeknownst to the New Zealand Government, the British Admiralty decided that the convoy would rendezvous with the modern escorts at Noumea in New Caledonia.

Here the convoy was joined by HMAS Australia and the Montcalm, along with the cruiser HMAS Melbourne, the entire expedition, now under the command of Rear Admiral George Patey, went on to Fiji. Here several Legion-of-Frontiersmen and Samoan interpreters joined the SEF and it then sailed for Samoa on 27 August.

== Landing and occupation ==
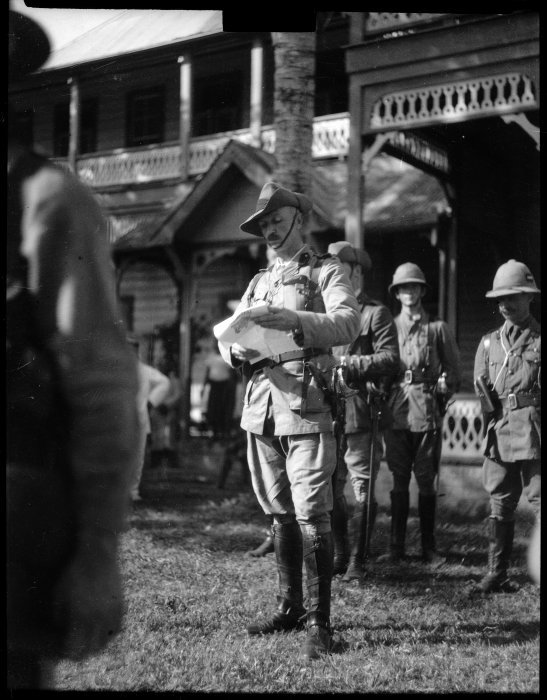
Colonel Robert Logan reading a proclamation in Apia, Samoa, on 30 August 1914, the day he assumed responsibility as military administrator.

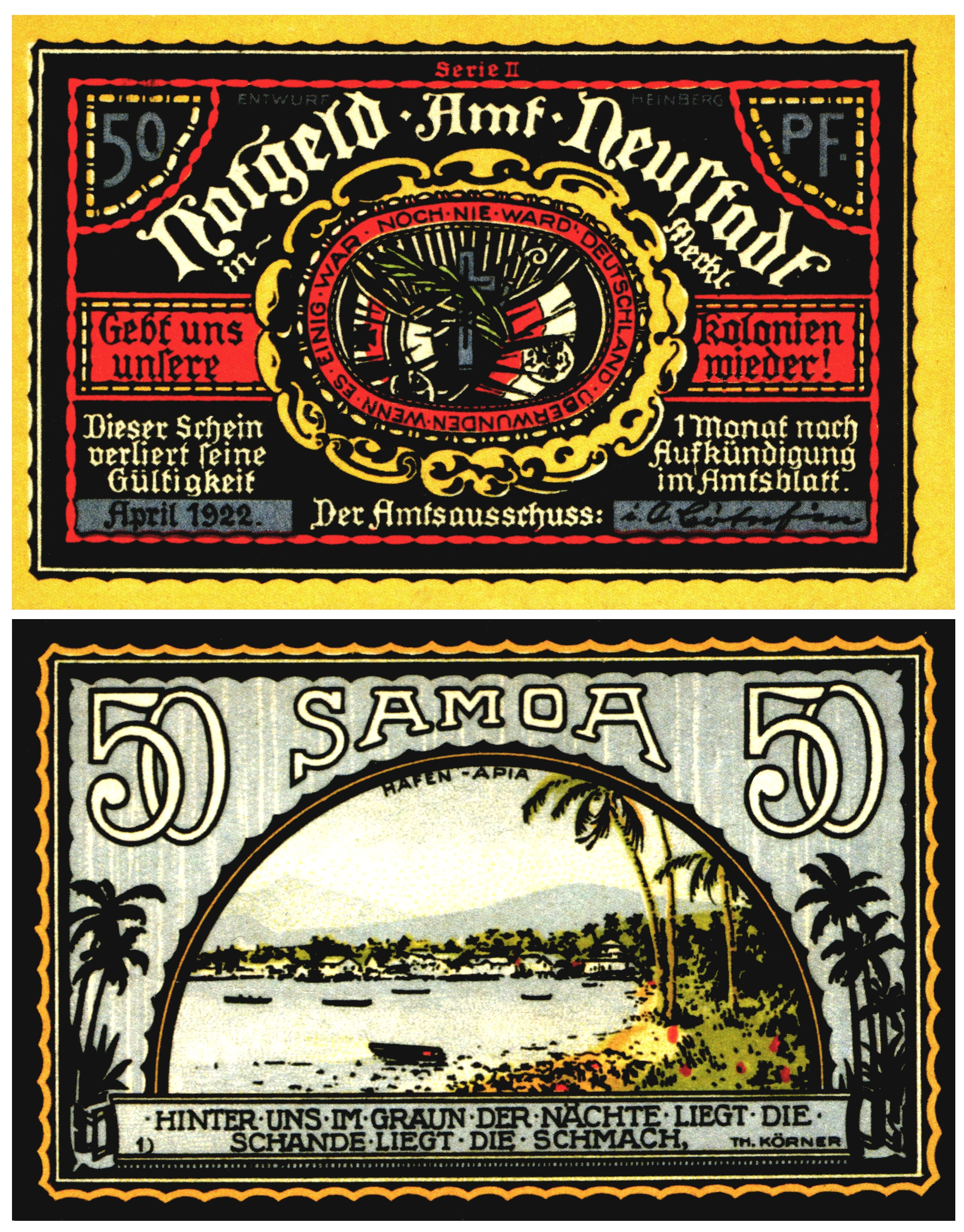
"Notgeld" banknote (1922). The text complains about the loss of the colony.

The convoy arrived off Apia, on Samoa's main island of Upolu, on the morning of 29 August. At Apia, there were no defensive arrangements in place with only around 100 local militia (known as Fita-fita) available. Intelligence provided by the Australian authorities had already indicated that opposition was likely to be around 80 constables with a cadre of German officers along with a gunboat. (Note: Francis Fisher, the New Zealand Minister of Marine from 1912 to 1915, later recalled in a book published by Downie Stewart in 1937, that the New Zealand Government asked the British Colonial Secretary in London what defences there were in Samoa. He allegedly advised that it should consult Whitaker's Almanac but this was not supported by a search of papers in Archives New Zealand.) However, the Germans could not count on the support of the Samoans to defend any attempts at a landing. The Governor of German Samoa, Erich Schultz-Ewerth, had proceeded to the wireless station upon observing the approach of the convoy.

While the Australian warships, together with the Montcalm, stood off from Apia, the Psyche proceeded into the town's harbour under a flag of truce. Transmissions from the wireless station were detected but these ceased following orders from Patey. After an hour, a message from Schultz indicated that although Germany would not officially surrender the Samoan islands, there would be no resistance to a landing by the New Zealanders. Upon receiving this news, the troopships began transferring the New Zealand soldiers into launches and shuttling them to shore. Government buildings, including the post office and telegraph exchange, were seized by early evening and a party dispatched to the wireless station, in the hills several kilometres away near the terminus of the Telefunken Railroad. By the time the New Zealanders arrived, close to midnight, the German operators had sabotaged much of the radio equipment rendering it inoperative. Troops dispersed to camps and were allocated patrol areas.

The following day, a ceremonial raising of the Union Jack took place in front of the courthouse, with Logan declaring the occupation of Samoa by the New Zealand Government on behalf of King George V. (Note: In the volume of the Official History of New Zealand's Effort in the Great War concerning the seizure of Samoa, it was claimed that Samoa was the first German territory captured in the war by British Imperial Forces. This is incorrect; the first seizure of a German colony had taken place four days earlier at Togoland, captured as part of the West Africa Campaign.) The damage to the wireless station prevented the success of the SEF being reported back to New Zealand until its repair on 2 September. In the meantime, stores from the troopships were unloaded and a railway line constructed from the Apia harbourside to the wireless station.

Having completed their escort duties and with Samoa now secured, the Australian ships, plus the Montcalm, departed to join up with the Australian Naval and Military Expeditionary Force, which was tasked with the capture of German New Guinea. Over the following days, the remaining P-class cruisers also left; two sailed for American Samoa and Tonga to inform the respective authorities of the occupation of Samoa. The Pyramus took five German prisoners, including Schultz, to Fiji.

The German cruisers Scharnhorst and Gneisenau hastened to Samoa after Admiral von Spee learned of the occupation. He arrived off Apia on 14 September, three days after the departure of the last of the Allied cruisers and transports. The approach of the German ships was observed and the New Zealanders promptly manned their defences while many civilians, fearing exchanges of gunfire, made for the hills. By this stage artillery had been set up on the beach but there was no exchange of gunfire. One historian, Ian McGibbon, wrote that this was likely due to von Spee's fears of damage to German property should he open fire. Instead, von Spee steamed off and landed a small party further down the coast and learned from a German resident there the apparent strength of the occupation. Patrols dispatched to the area later interned the German resident. According to the historian J. A. C. Gray, von Spee considered a landing by the forces under his control would only be of temporary advantage in an Allied-dominated sea and so the German ships then made for Tahiti, a French possession. Here, not having to be concerned with the welfare of the local population and their property, von Spee would direct the bombardment of Papeete. He then rejoined the rest of his fleet and headed for South America.

== Aftermath ==
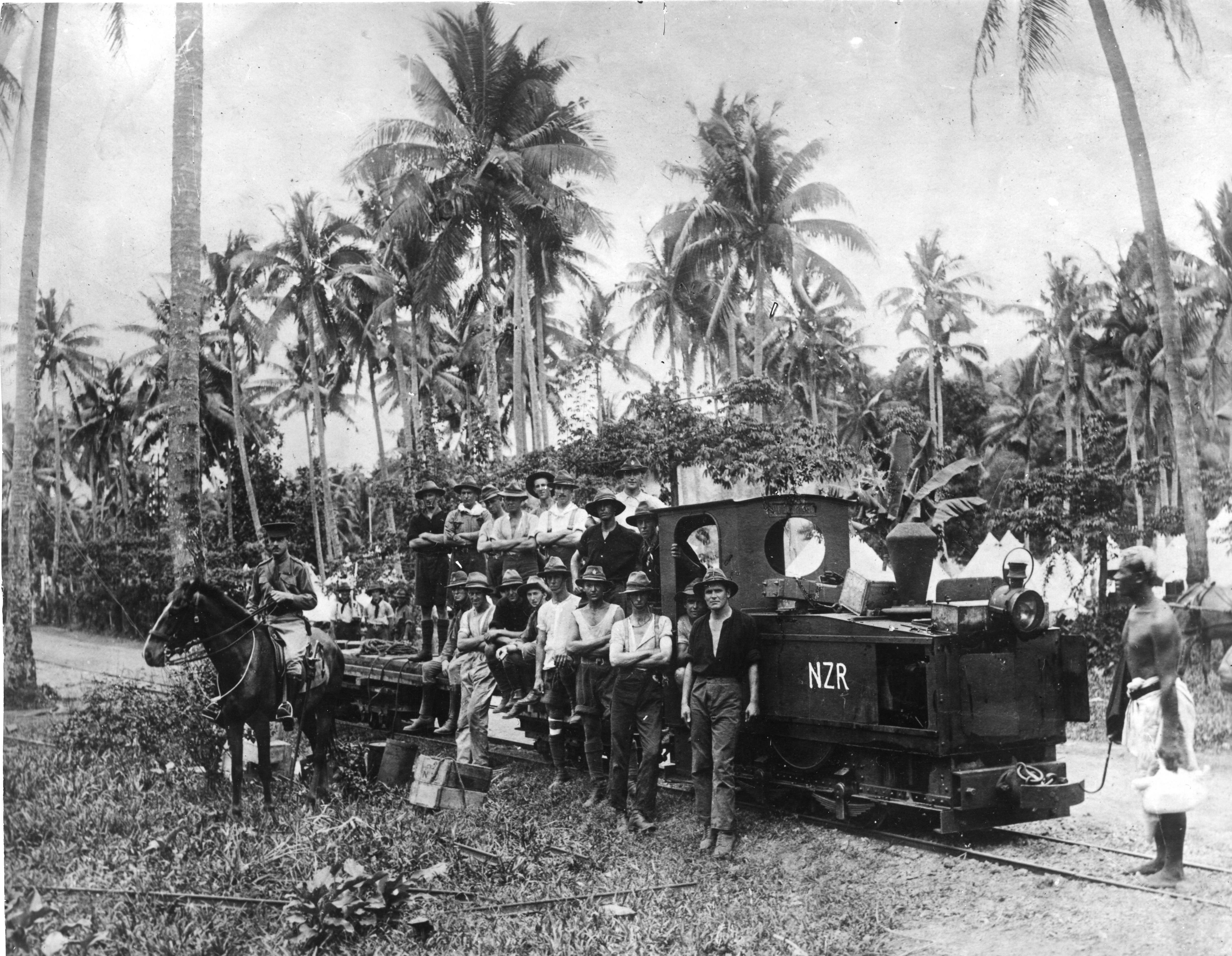
New Zealand troops in Samoa, c. 1914–15.

The SEF remained in Samoa until March 1915, at which time it began returning to New Zealand. A small relief force arrived in Apia on 3 April and the troopship that brought them to Samoa transported the last of the SEF back to New Zealand. Logan remained and would continue to administer the country on behalf of the New Zealand Government until 1919. His term was controversial because he significantly mishandled the arrival of the Spanish flu influenza pandemic in November 1918, resulting in over 7,500 deaths.

From 1920 until Samoan independence in 1962, New Zealand governed the islands as the Western Samoa Trust Territory, firstly as a League of Nations Class C Mandate, and then from 1945 as a United Nations Trust Territory.

== Notes ==
Footnotes

Citations
